= Hurricane Kirk (2024) =

Category 4 Atlantic hurricane

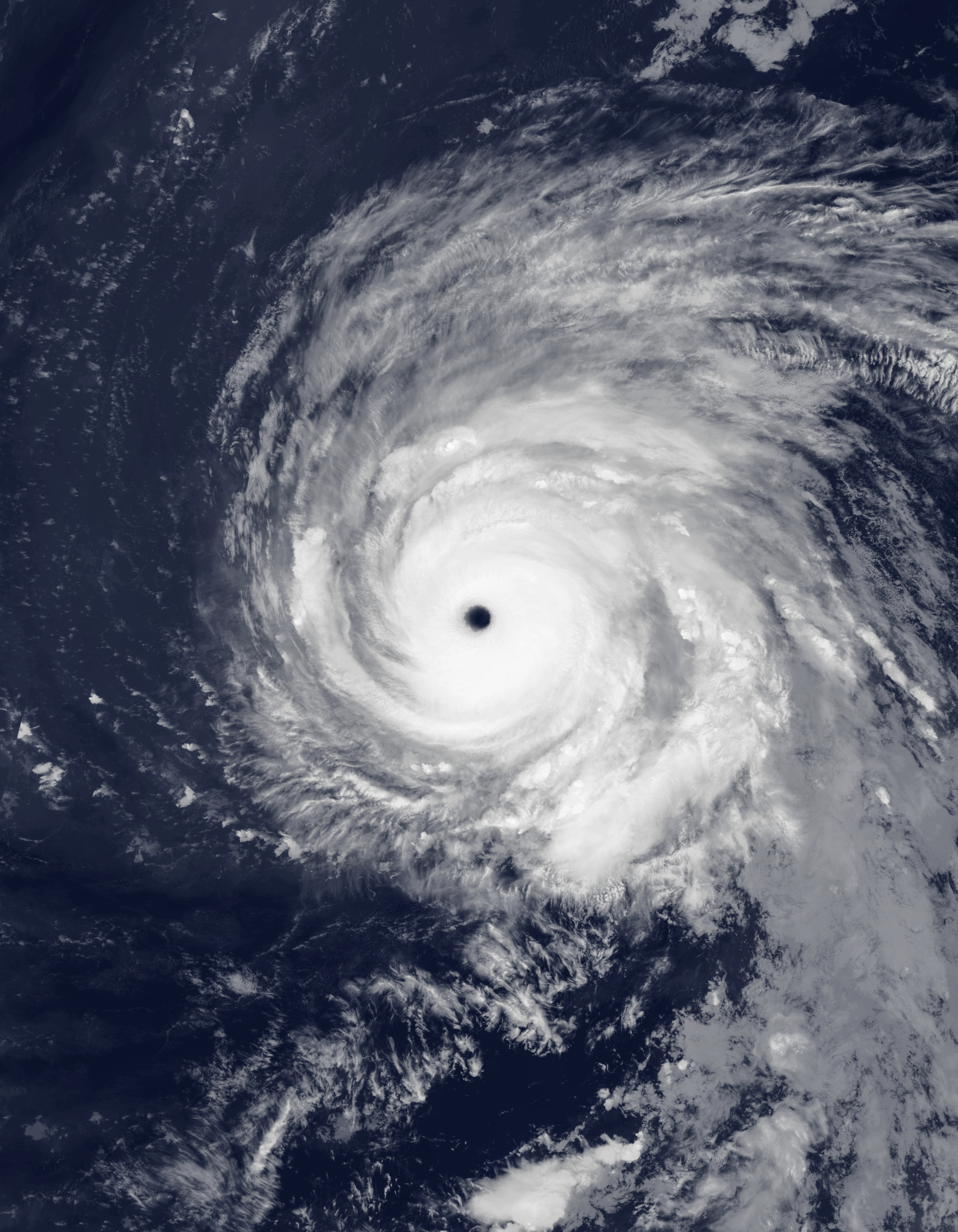
- Hurricane Kirk near peak intensity in the open Atlantic early on 4 October

Meteorological history
- Formed: 29 September 2024
- Extratropical: 7 October 2024
- Dissipated: 10 October 2024

Category 4 major hurricane
- 1-minute sustained (SSHWS/NWS)
- Highest winds: 150 mph (240 km/h)
- Lowest pressure: 928 mbar (hPa); 27.40 inHg

Overall effects
- Fatalities: 1
- Injuries: 9
- Damage: $110 million (2024 USD)
- Areas affected: Puerto Rico; Portugal; Spain; Andorra; France; Netherlands; Belgium; Luxembourg; Switzerland; Germany; Sweden; Norway
- Part of the 2024 Atlantic hurricane and 2024–25 European windstorm seasons

Hurricane Kirk, known as Storm Kirk while extratropical, was a large and powerful tropical cyclone that caused significant damage in portions of Western Europe after transitioning into a European windstorm. The eleventh named storm, seventh hurricane, and third major hurricane of the 2024 Atlantic hurricane season, Kirk originated from a broad area of low pressure near Cape Verde. Showers associated with the system became better organized, and satellite imagery on 29 September showed that the disturbance had consolidated into a tropical depression; it became Tropical Storm Kirk the next day.

Favourable atmospheric and oceanic conditions fostered strengthening, though this trend levelled off after Kirk became a hurricane on 1 October. A period of renewed rapid intensification brought Kirk to peak intensity as a Category 4 hurricane on the Saffir–Simpson scale, with winds of 240 km/h (150 mph), on 4 October. Gradually curving to the northeast, Kirk weakened after peak intensity due to cooler sea surface temperatures, dry air, and wind shear, while also gaining size with latitude; it became an extratropical cyclone on 7 October. As it moved eastwards towards Western Europe, Kirk became the fifth storm of the 2024–25 European windstorm season. Additionally, 6 tornadoes occurred as it made landfall in Europe. As of January 2025, losses are at US$110 million according to AON.

== Meteorological history ==
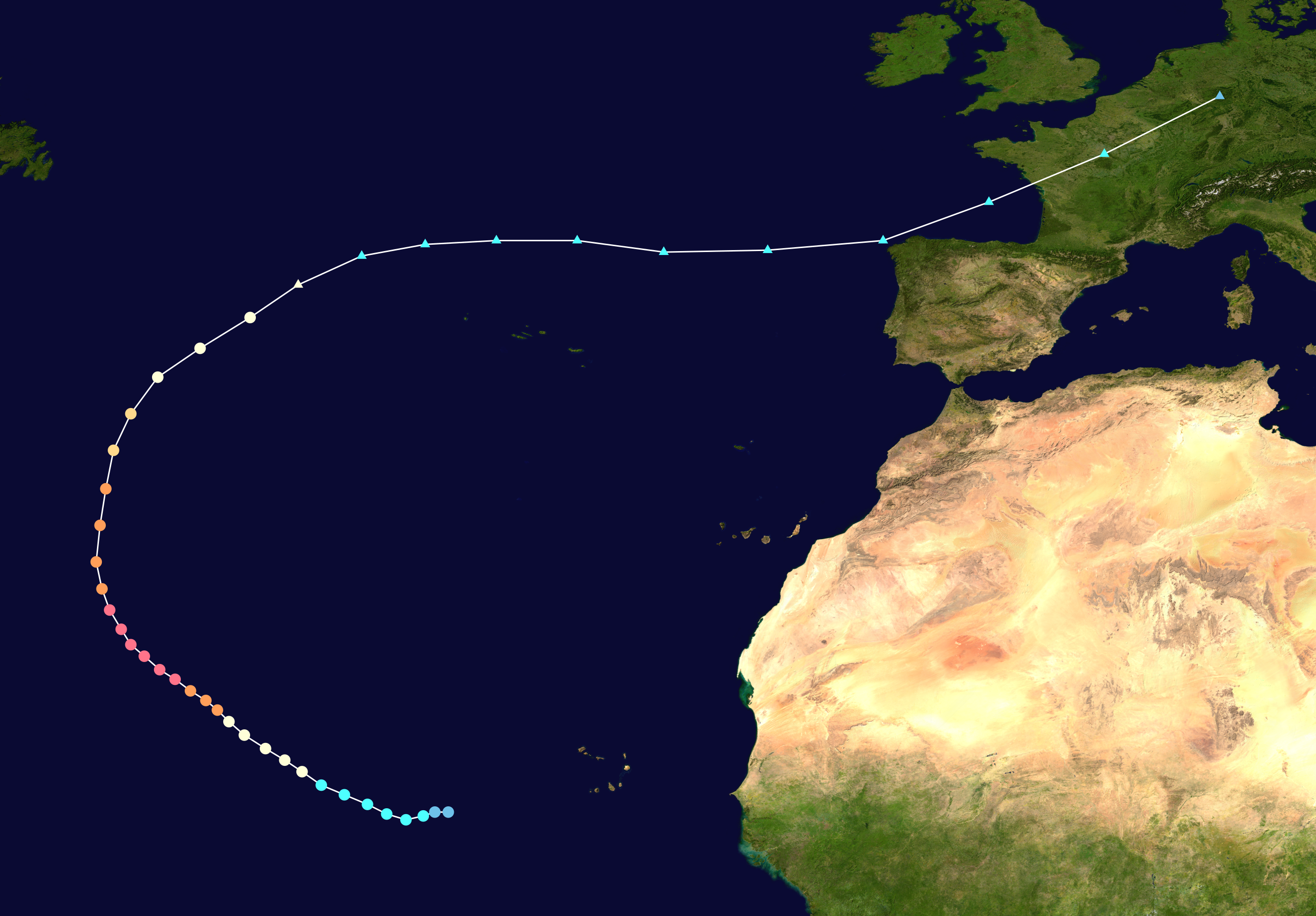
Map plotting the storm's track and intensity, according to the Saffir–Simpson scale Map key Saffir–Simpson scale Tropical depression (≤38 mph, ≤62 km/h) Tropical storm (39–73 mph, 63–118 km/h) Category 1 (74–95 mph, 119–153 km/h) Category 2 (96–110 mph, 154–177 km/h) Category 3 (111–129 mph, 178–208 km/h) Category 4 (130–156 mph, 209–251 km/h) Category 5 (≥157 mph, ≥252 km/h) Unknown Storm type Tropical cyclone Subtropical cyclone Extratropical cyclone, remnant low, tropical disturbance, or monsoon depression

The National Hurricane Center (NHC) first forecast the possibility of tropical cyclogenesis in the eastern tropical Atlantic on 27 September. The next day, the NHC began monitoring a broad area of low pressure associated with a tropical wave producing limited shower activity west of Cabo Verde, noting that environmental conditions were favourable for development. As showers and thunderstorms associated with the disturbance became better organised, satellite imagery on 29 September revealed that the disturbance's circulation was becoming better defined. As a result, by 21:00 UTC that day, it developed into Tropical Depression Twelve. At that time, a prominent subtropical ridge to the depression's north steered the system westward.

Organization was at first gradual as the depression continued to produce deep convection. The depression strengthened into Tropical Storm Kirk at 15:00 UTC on 30 September, with satellite microwave imagery from a few hours earlier indicating that a nascent core with a partial eyewall had formed. Shortly thereafter, Kirk's intensification paused, its structure improving little as it tracked west-northwest along the southwestern edge of the subtropical ridge. This pause was short-lived, with intensification resuming on 1 October as the storm's satellite presentation improved. Signs of dry air on Kirk's western flank remained apparent, possibly introduced by some northerly mid-level wind shear. Kirk's structure continued to improve on microwave imagery, and the storm intensified to a Category 1 hurricane at 21:00 UTC that day. After an intrusion of dry air briefly interrupted further intensification, continued improvements to Kirk's structure signalled a resumption in strengthening throughout 2 October.

Kirk then initiated an episode of rapid intensification, becoming a Category 3 hurricane at 00:00 UTC on 3 October, with satellite imagery displaying a ragged eye surrounded by multiple rotating convective bursts. Soon after, yet another intrusion of dry air halted this period of rapid intensification, causing Kirk to weaken slightly. This disruption was also short-lived, as the hurricane's structure quickly recovered, and by 21:00 UTC that day Kirk strengthened into a Category 4 hurricane. Kirk then strengthened to its peak intensity early on 4 October, with sustained winds of 240 km/h (150 mph) and a minimum central pressure of 928 mbar (27.4 inHg); the NHC noted a well-defined circular eye 37 km (23 mi) wide surrounded by a ring of deep convection. Soon after, microwave imagery suggested an eyewall replacement cycle had initiated, causing the hurricane to begin weakening. As an outer convective band wrapped around the eyewall, Kirk's eye became cloud-filled and its cloud tops warmed. Southwesterly shear and intrusions of dry air additionally contributed to weakening, with Kirk falling to Category 3 intensity at 09:00 UTC on 5 October. At the same time, the hurricane began a northward turn, influenced by a shortwave trough placed over the west-central Atlantic and the subtropical ridge to its east. Kirk then weakened further to Category 2 intensity 24 hours later under the effects of increasing southwesterly shear, the vertical structure of its core becoming disrupted as a result.

Another 12 hours later, at 21:00 UTC on 6 October, Kirk weakened to a Category 1 hurricane, with the NHC noting that its extratropical transition had begun. Tracking over cooler waters as it progressed through its extratropical transition, the NHC noted that Kirk's core had rapidly degraded, and by 19:00 UTC on 7 October, it had completed its transition to an extratropical cyclone as it tracked east-northeast over the northeastern Atlantic. The extratropical cyclone then passed north of the Azores, before moving towards the west coast of France and Western Europe. The system weakened as it progressed towards Sweden.

== Preparations ==
The NHC issued advisories saying that waves from Kirk could create life-threatening conditions in Bermuda and the East Coast of the United States.

A red alert was issued in the western group of the Azores as swells generated by a weakening Hurricane Kirk were projected to batter the coastline. Some of the more eastern groups saw orange and yellow alerts issued. All fishing boats and ships at ports were removed from the coast and placed into safer areas.

France enforced a yellow rain warning for much of the country except for the far southeast of the country and regions on the English Channel. An orange rain warning with an accompanying yellow wind warning was issued for parts of the northwest, including Paris, as well as for the Pyrenees on the Spanish border. A red warning was later added for Seine-et-Marne for flooding. In Spain warnings were issued for widespread strong winds, with gusts potentially reaching hurricane force in parts of northern Spain, heavy rain, especially in Galicia and the western part of the Iberian Peninsula, and significant wave heights along the Atlantic coast. A red wind warning was issued for Picos de Europa where winds up to 86 mph (138 km/h) were expected. Many flights leaving Santander, A Coruña, Bilbao, Vigo, and Santiago de Compostela were cancelled. In Portugal, an orange coastal event warning was enforced due to the anticipated large wave heights of 5–6 metres (16–20 ft), with a yellow wind warning where, southwest winds with gusts of up to 75 km/h (47 mph), reaching up to 100 km/h (62 mph) in mountainous areas. Many flights were delayed or cancelled and parks were closed.

Orange rain warnings were issued for all of Luxembourg in response to Kirk. A yellow rain warning was issued for the entirety of Andorra. Germany also issued orange rain warnings for many central areas, as well as a red rain warning encompassing many south-western areas. An orange wind warnings has also been issued for southern regions. Switzerland as also issued yellow wind warnings for central and eastern parts of the country. An amber warning was also issued in Belgium. Citizens in Limburg in the Netherlands were urged to prepare for flooding and heavy rainfall.

More than 1 million people across coastal areas of Europe were placed under evacuation orders.

== Impact ==
=== Iberian Peninsula ===
In Porto, Portugal's main northern city, the storm hit hardest, uprooting 400 trees. Cars were damaged, and rail services were interrupted near Barcelos, also in the north. The storm cut power to more than 300,000 households, according to the country's electricity supplier. Weather and civil protection officials, who had predicted winds of up to 75 mph (121 km/h) and heavy rain, placed the coast on a yellow alert as waves reached up to seven metres (23 ft) high. While not many homes were damaged, multiple vehicles were. The Linha do Minho was interrupted by falling trees. In Vila Nova de Gaia, a crane was knocked over, damaging a large building. Spanish weather officials issued an orange alert for the north and northwest of the country, warning of winds up to 87 mph (140 km/h) in the Asturias region. In Galicia, the northwest reported roads blocked by mudslides and fallen trees in urban areas. Portugal's civil protection authority reported over 1,300 incidents from Tuesday night to Wednesday, with three-quarters involving fallen trees in the north. Spain also experienced heavy winds and rainfall, with waves as high as seven metres crashing ashore, according to local media. Storm Kirk primarily wreaked havoc in the northern half of Spain. Strong gusts caused delays and cancellations in rail and air services, park closures, collapsed roofs, and damage from fallen trees. In Castile and León, 5 people were injured due to falling objects. These injuries were in Burgos, Soria, and Segovia. In Valladolid, a roof was completely blown off of a building, but no one was hurt. A total of 370 incidents were reported in the region. A scaffolding tower collapsed due to hurricane-force winds in Berria, Cantabria. A foot bridge over the Douro River collapsed due to Kirk. Two people required medical attention after a car accident in Valladolid. Strong winds and heavy rainfall battered Andorra due to Kirk's circulation, with maximum gusts of 126 kilometres per hour (78 mph) in Port d'Envalira and rainfall of 34 millimetres (1.3 in). Strong winds from Kirk severely impacted Portugal's apple production, with over 65% of the crops suffering damage. Losses from this are estimated to be greater than €10 million (US$10.9 million). Portugal's chestnut production also suffered from the passage of the storm, with 40–50% of crops being damaged. Losses are valued at €20–30 million (US$20.9–31.3 million). In Galicia, around 20,000 hectares of crops were damaged. Losses from this are estimated at €69 million (US$71.9 million).

=== France ===
At least 5 tornado reports were reported in France. An IF0.5 Tornado struck Rots, downing trees and damaging roofs and barns. An IF1 tornado hit Brive-la-Gaillarde, downing trees, fences, and powerlines. Two waterspouts were observed near Flamanville. Another IF1 tornado touched down in Cubry-lès-Faverney, damaging 8 houses, 3 vehicles, and 2 garages, causing one garage to collapse. In southern France, a storm swell near the port city of Sete, Hérault overturned three boats, killing one amateur sailor and leaving another two in critical condition. Additionally, 64,000 people in the south of France were left without power, as reported by Enedis to AFP, while several departments saw roads cut off by floodwaters. The worst-hit area, Pyrenees-Atlantiques, saw 35,000 households lose electricity, with other southwestern and central eastern departments also affected. Over 67,000 more people were left without power after the storm pushed through. The Grand Morin river swelled, leading to flooding along the coast. The Paris-Montsouris weather station recorded 71 millimetres (2.8 in) of rainfall in 24h, a number not seen since 1920. The heavy rainfall led to widespread flooding across numerous regions in France. Thousands of people were affected by the flooding.

By midday on 10 October, over 48,000 homes were still without power, and 161 towns were under a flood warning.

=== Elsewhere ===
Kirk interacted with another low pressure system in the Atlantic, causing heavy rain and gusty winds in Puerto Rico. 51–102 mm (2–4 in) inches of rain fell, causing flooding and landslides along roadways, rendering them impassable. Damage to the region totaled to US$5,000.

In the Azores, there were multiple reports of fallen trees and power lines that forced road closures. A market stall and a scaffolding structure collapsed, damaging two vehicles. However, no major damage was reported.

The Ardennes of Belgium, Luxembourg, and France felt the most rain. Couvin in Belgium saw many buildings flooded, activating the Commune's emergency plan. In Luxembourg, the heaviest rainfall was around the Upper Sûre Lake. A park in Mersch was flooded, but only few homes suffered damage. Overall, damage in Belgium was minimal. In Sweden, the regions of Västerbotten and Västernorrland, 50 millimetres (2.0 in) of rain fell. The rainfall led to many streams overflowing. A yellow and orange alert was issued in the country. In Switzerland, the fire department carried out over 10 operations in St. Gallen due to high winds from Kirk. High winds generated by Kirk were reported in Germany, with windspeeds reaching 65 kilometres per hour (40 mph). The rail network between Stuttgart and Filderstadt was suspended due to a damaged overhead line. Winds from Kirk also knocked down trees, some of which also ended up on train tracks. In the southwest, falling trees caused 30 emergencies in which the fire department was involved.

== See also ==
- Other storms of the same name
- Weather of 2024
- Tropical cyclones in 2024
- Timeline of the 2024 Atlantic hurricane season
- List of Category 4 Atlantic hurricanes
- List of European tropical cyclones
- Hurricane Lorenzo (2019) – Category 5 hurricane which took a similar path and affected Western Europe while extratropical
