= List of storms named Kirk =

The name Kirk has been used for four tropical cyclones worldwide, three in the Atlantic Ocean and one in the Western Pacific Ocean.

== Atlantic ==
Kirk has been used three times since 2012, when it replaced the name Keith on the list of hurricane names.

- Hurricane Kirk (2012) – Category 2 hurricane that stayed in the open ocean.
- Tropical Storm Kirk (2018) – a low latitude storm; affecting Lesser Antilles.
- Hurricane Kirk (2024) – long-lived Category 4 major hurricane that churned in the open ocean; affected Europe as a post-tropical cyclone.

== Western Pacific ==
- Typhoon Kirk (1996) (T9610, 13W, Isang) – a moderate category 2 typhoon which struck Japan, causing at least 2 deaths, and moderate damage.
