= Cubry-lès-Faverney =

- Commune
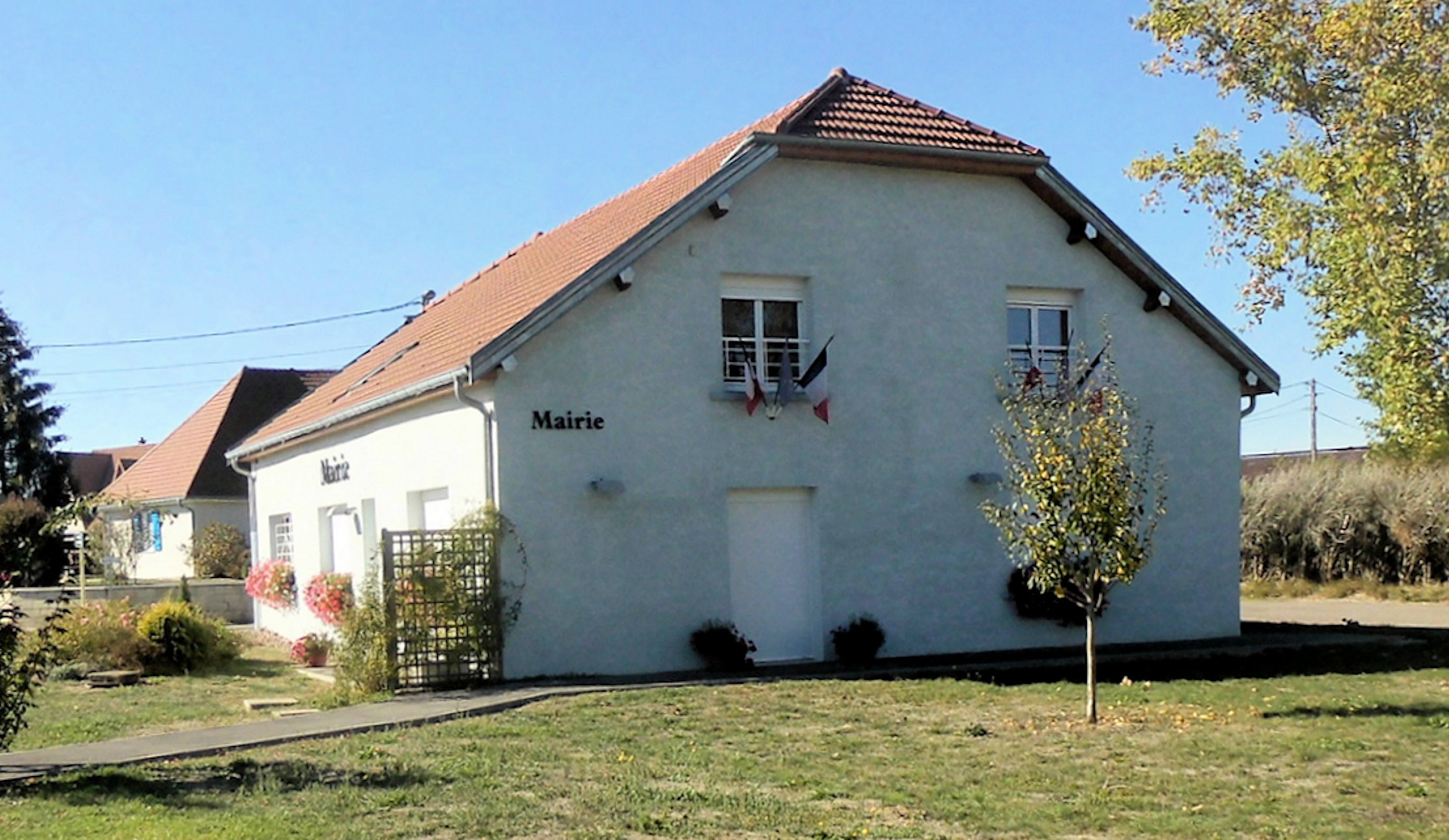
- The town hall in Cubry-lès-Faverney

- Coat of arms
- Location of Cubry-lès-Faverney
- Location within France Location within Bourgogne-Franche-Comté
- Coordinates: 47°48′42″N 6°07′56″E
- Country: France
- Region: Bourgogne-Franche-Comté
- Department: Haute-Saône
- Arrondissement: Lure
- Canton: Port-sur-Saône

Government
  - Mayor (2020–2026): Christian Bardin
- Area^{1}: 5.59 km^{2} (2.16 sq mi)
- Highest elevation: 305 m (1,001 ft)
- Lowest elevation: 222 m (728 ft)
- Population (2023): 186
  - Density: 33.3/km^{2} (86.2/sq mi)
- Time zone: UTC+01:00 (CET)
  - Summer (DST): UTC+02:00 (CEST)
- INSEE/Postal code: 70190 /70160
- ^{1} French Land Register data, which excludes lakes, ponds, glaciers > 1 km^{2} (0.386 sq mi or 247 acres) and river estuaries.

Cubry-lès-Faverney (French pronunciation: [kybʁi lɛ favɛʁnɛ], literally Cubry near Faverney) is a commune in the Haute-Saône department in the region of Bourgogne-Franche-Comté in eastern France.

== See also ==
- Communes of the Haute-Saône department
