= List of storms named Gert =

The name Gert has been used for seven tropical cyclones in the Atlantic Ocean:

- Hurricane Gert (1981) – caused heavy rainfall to several islands in the Caribbean but no significant damage.
- Hurricane Gert (1993) – formed near and later made landfall in Central America and then twice in Mexico, before existing the basin and moved to the eastern Pacific basin where it later dissipated.
- Hurricane Gert (1999) – reached Category 4 strength, threatened Bermuda before turning away.
- Tropical Storm Gert (2005) – made landfall near Tampico, Mexico.
- Tropical Storm Gert (2011) – formed in the open ocean, passed close to Bermuda, brushing the island with light rainfall.
- Hurricane Gert (2017) – a Category 2 hurricane that caused high surf along the East Coast of the United States.
- Tropical Storm Gert (2023) – regenerated back into a tropical storm almost two weeks after dissipating.

== See also ==
- Hurricane Gertrude (1974) – an Atlantic hurricane with a similar name.
