= List of storms named Chris =

The name Chris has been used for eight tropical cyclones in the Atlantic Ocean, one in the West Pacific Ocean, and three in the Australian region.

In the Atlantic:

- Tropical Storm Chris (1982) – made landfall in Texas
- Tropical Storm Chris (1988) – affected the Caribbean and the United States, causing six fatalities
- Hurricane Chris (1994) – a Category 1 hurricane that affected Bermuda
- Tropical Storm Chris (2000) – did not affect land
- Tropical Storm Chris (2006) – caused minimal damage in the Caribbean
- Hurricane Chris (2012) – a Category 1 hurricane that affected Bermuda and Atlantic Canada
- Hurricane Chris (2018) – a Category 2 hurricane that affected the East Coast of the United States
- Tropical Storm Chris (2024) – made landfall in Mexico, causing six fatalities

In the West Pacific:

- Tropical Storm Chris (1948)

In the Australian region:

- Cyclone Chris (1982) – a Category 3 severe tropical cyclone that also existed in the South-West Indian Ocean as Cyclone Damia
- Cyclone Chris (1991) – a Category 2 tropical cyclone that affected Western Australia
- Cyclone Chris (2002) – a Category 5 severe tropical cyclone that became one of the strongest cyclones to make landfall in Australia

The name Chris was retired in the Australian region following its 2002 usage, being replaced by Clancy.

== See also ==
European windstorms with similar names:

- St. Jude storm (2013) – named Christian by the Free University of Berlin (FUB)
- Cyclone Christina (2014) – affected multiple countries in Western Europe and Morocco, causing three fatalities
- Storm Athina (2021) – tracked by the FUB as Cyclone Christian
- Storm Christoph (2021) – affected the United Kingdom, Republic of Ireland, and Scandinavia
