= List of storms named Beryl =

The name Beryl has been used for eight tropical cyclones in the Atlantic Ocean, two in the Australian Region and for one in the South-West Indian Ocean.

== Atlantic Ocean ==
- Tropical Storm Beryl (1982) – passed just south of Brava Island, Cape Verde and dissipated north of the Windward Islands
- Tropical Storm Beryl (1988) – formed over Lake Pontchartrain, Louisiana and drifted into the Gulf of Mexico before making landfall in New Orleans
- Tropical Storm Beryl (1994) – short-lived storm that made landfall in Panama City, Florida, and caused severe flooding in several states along the East Coast of the United States
- Tropical Storm Beryl (2000) – developed in the Bay of Campeche and made landfall just south of the United States–Mexico border
- Tropical Storm Beryl (2006) – made landfall on Nantucket, Massachusetts
- Tropical Storm Beryl (2012) – made landfall near Jacksonville Beach, Florida
- Hurricane Beryl (2018) – tiny Category 1 hurricane which dissipated before approaching the Lesser Antilles; later briefly regenerated into a subtropical storm to the north of Bermuda
- Hurricane Beryl (2024) – destructive Category 5 hurricane, earliest Category 4 and Category 5 Atlantic hurricane on record in any season; made landfall on Carriacou, the Yucatán Peninsula, and in Texas

The name Beryl was retired after the 2024 season due to its destructive impacts across the Caribbean, particularly in Grenada and St. Vincent and Grenadines, Mexico, and Texas. The name was replaced with Brianna for the 2030 season.

== Australian Region ==
- Cyclone Beryl (1966)
- Cyclone Beryl (1973) – made landfall near Carnarvon, Western Australia as a Tropical Storm and quickly dissipated inland

== Indian Ocean ==
- Cyclone Beryl (1961) – drifted west of Réunion, dissipated while quickly speeding to the south
