= Hurricane Chris (2018) =

Category 2 Atlantic hurricane

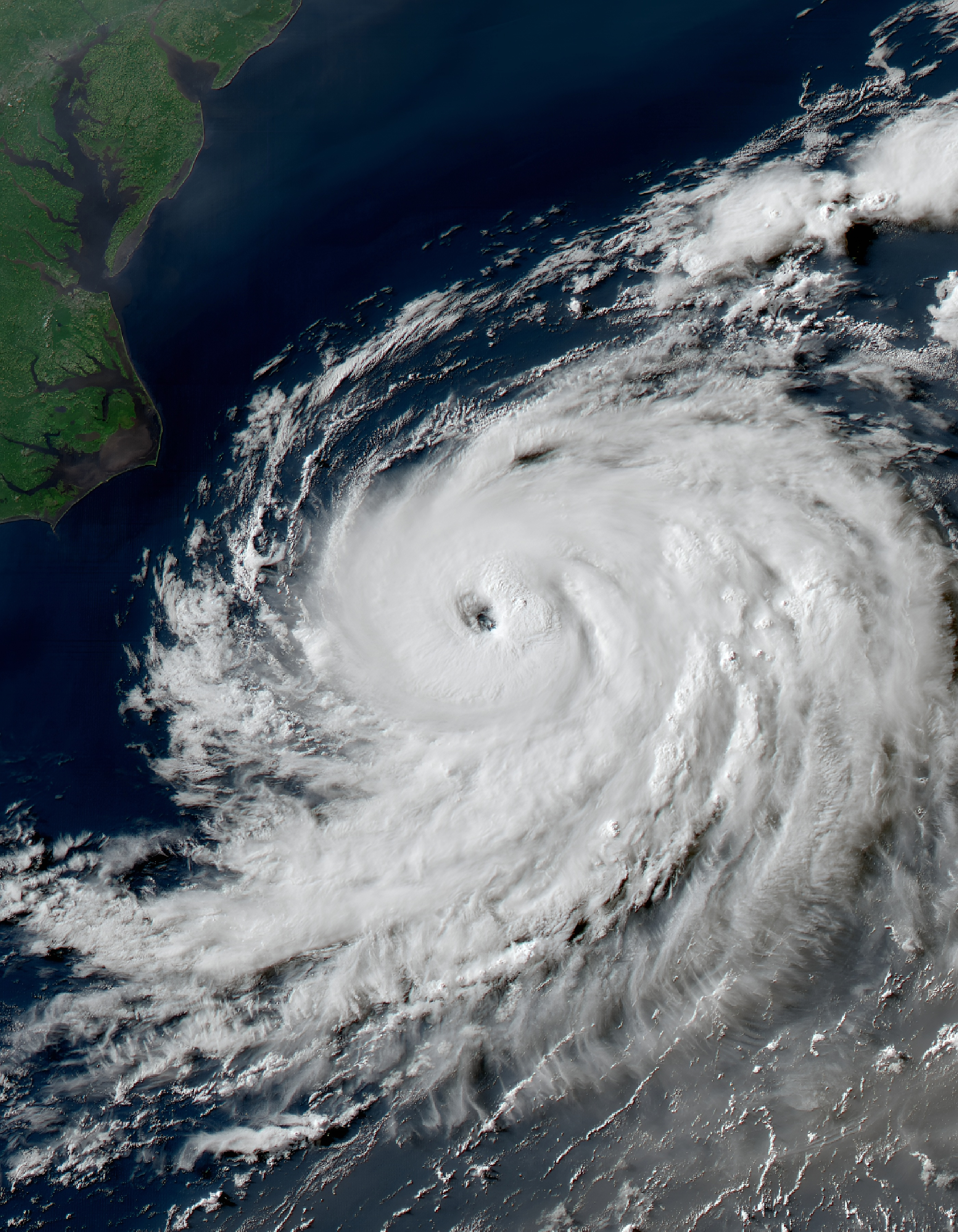
- Chris nearing peak intensity east of The Carolinas on July 10

Meteorological history
- Formed: July 6, 2018
- Extratropical: July 12, 2018
- Dissipated: July 17, 2018

Category 2 hurricane
- 1-minute sustained (SSHWS/NWS)
- Highest winds: 105 mph (165 km/h)
- Lowest pressure: 969 mbar (hPa); 28.61 inHg

Overall effects
- Fatalities: 1 total
- Damage: Minimal
- Areas affected: East Coast of the United States, Bermuda, Atlantic Canada, Iceland
- IBTrACS
- Part of the 2018 Atlantic hurricane season

Hurricane Chris was a moderately strong tropical cyclone that affected the East Coast of the United States and Atlantic Canada in July 2018. The third tropical cyclone, third named storm, and second hurricane of the 2018 Atlantic hurricane season, Chris originated from a frontal system that moved offshore the coast of the northeastern United States on June 29. The front evolved into a non-tropical low by July 3. After further organization, a tropical depression formed on July 6, several hundred miles south-southeast of Cape Hatteras, North Carolina. Two days later, the depression strengthened into a tropical storm and received the name Chris. Chris slowly strengthened as it drifted into warmer waters. These favorable conditions allowed Chris to rapidly intensify into a hurricane on July 10. The hurricane reached its peak intensity with winds of 105 mph (165 km/h) and a pressure of 969 mbar (28.61 inHg) at. This peak intensity was short-lived though, as Chris began to undergo extratropical transition. At 12:00 UTC on July 12, Chris became an extratropical cyclone well southeast of Newfoundland. The low continued northeastward over the Atlantic for the next few days, before weakening and finally dissipating southeast of Iceland on July 17.

Numerous marine warnings were issued for the East Coast of the United States. The storm brought high surf and rip currents to much of the East Coast. Dozens of beach rescues were reported in the Carolinas, and a coastal state park was closed in Massachusetts. A man drowned in North Carolina after being swept away in a rip current. Rainbands from the cyclone caused some minor rainfall in Bermuda. Chris also affected Atlantic Canada as an extratropical cyclone. Two oil drilling companies, BP Canada and ExxonMobil, had to call a temporary hiatus in drilling until after the storm passed. Swells of more than 10 ft (3.0 m) affected the coastline of Newfoundland and Labrador. Strong wind gusts and several inches of rain were reported. Overall damage was minimal.

== Meteorological history ==
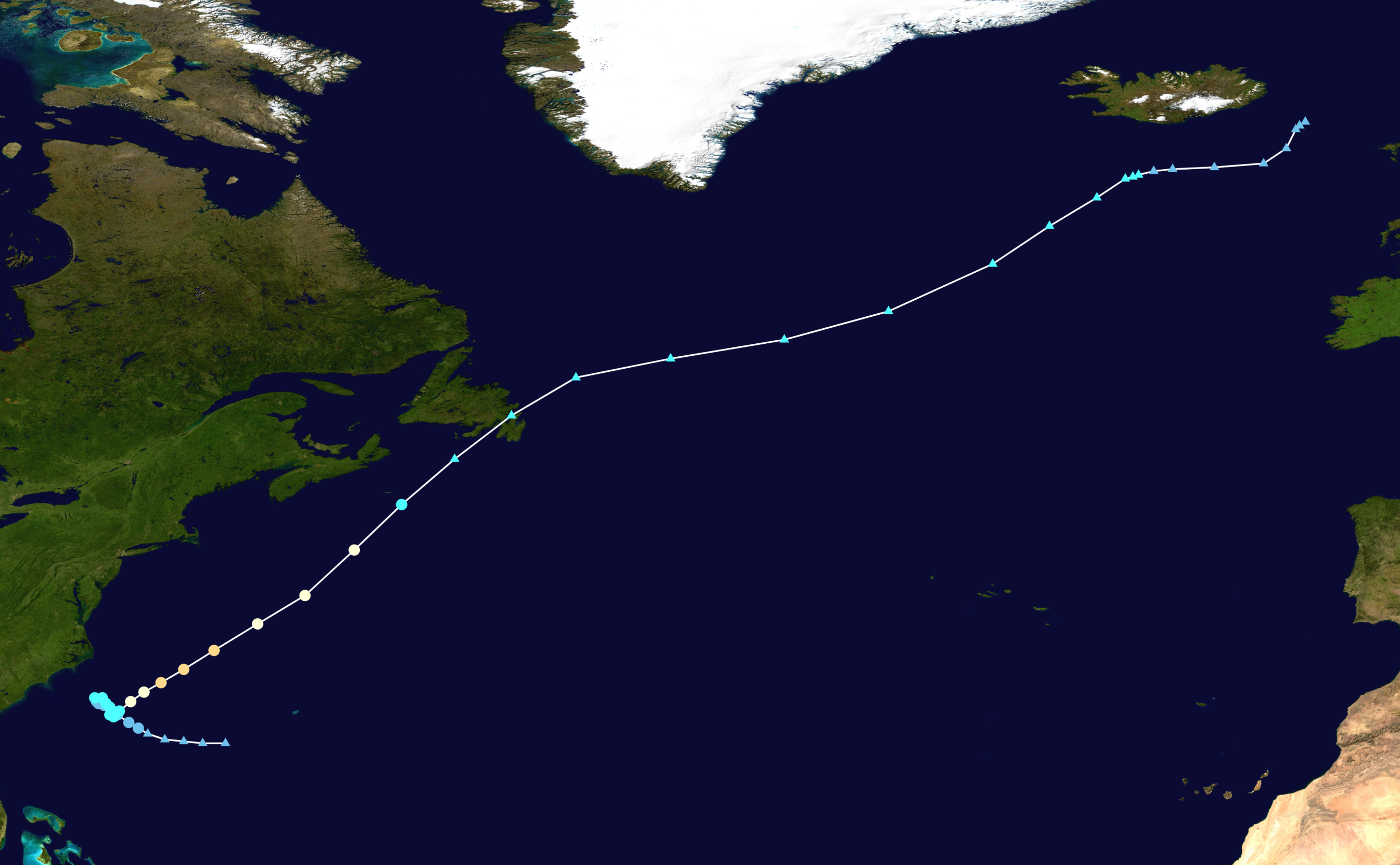
Map plotting the storm's track and intensity, according to the Saffir–Simpson scale Map key Saffir–Simpson scale Tropical depression (≤38 mph, ≤62 km/h) Tropical storm (39–73 mph, 63–118 km/h) Category 1 (74–95 mph, 119–153 km/h) Category 2 (96–110 mph, 154–177 km/h) Category 3 (111–129 mph, 178–208 km/h) Category 4 (130–156 mph, 209–251 km/h) Category 5 (≥157 mph, ≥252 km/h) Unknown Storm type Tropical cyclone Subtropical cyclone Extratropical cyclone, remnant low, tropical disturbance, or monsoon depression

A frontal system moved offshore the coast of the Northeastern United States on June 29. The frontal system headed southeast and dissipated by July 2. On that day, a large mid- to upper-level low formed north of Bermuda and moved southwestward beneath a strengthening ridge over eastern North America. The National Hurricane Center (NHC) first mentioned the possibility of tropical cyclogenesis, expecting an area of low pressure to form midway between Bermuda and the Southeastern United States. The remaining convection, or shower and thunderstorm activity, of the front and a new upper-level disturbance formed a surface low on July 4. The low gradually became better defined the next day. After deep convection developed over the center, a tropical depression formed around 12:00 UTC on July 6 about 300 mi (485 km) south-southeast of Cape Hatteras, North Carolina.

Despite being located over the Gulf Stream, which usually fuels the formation of thunderstorms, the depression's convection diminished greatly due to dry air, and the center was nearly devoid of thunderstorms early on July 7. An Air Force Hurricane Hunter reconnaissance aircraft found that the strongest winds remained displaced to a rainband south of the center. At 06:00 UTC on July 8, the depression strengthened into Tropical Storm Chris, though the low-level circulation center remained exposed north of the convection. Pulled slowly southeastward by a passing cold front, Chris intensified steadily throughout the rest of the day, as it was located in an area of warm sea surface temperatures and low wind shear. A National Oceanic and Atmospheric Administration Hurricane Hunter plane found that the wind field was becoming more symmetric and the pressure was dropping. Both banding and central convection increased, though a dry air intrusion put a halt to the strengthening trend early on July 9. Weak steering currents led Chris to stall a few hundred miles offshore Morehead City, as the cyclone was trapped in a large break in the subtropical ridge. Some dry air around Chris eroded its banding, causing the storm to acquire annular characteristics. A large cloud-filled eye became present, and a partial eyewall was detected by aircraft reconnaissance. However, significant upwelling prevented quick intensification initially, and Chris remained at tropical storm strength up to midday on July 10.

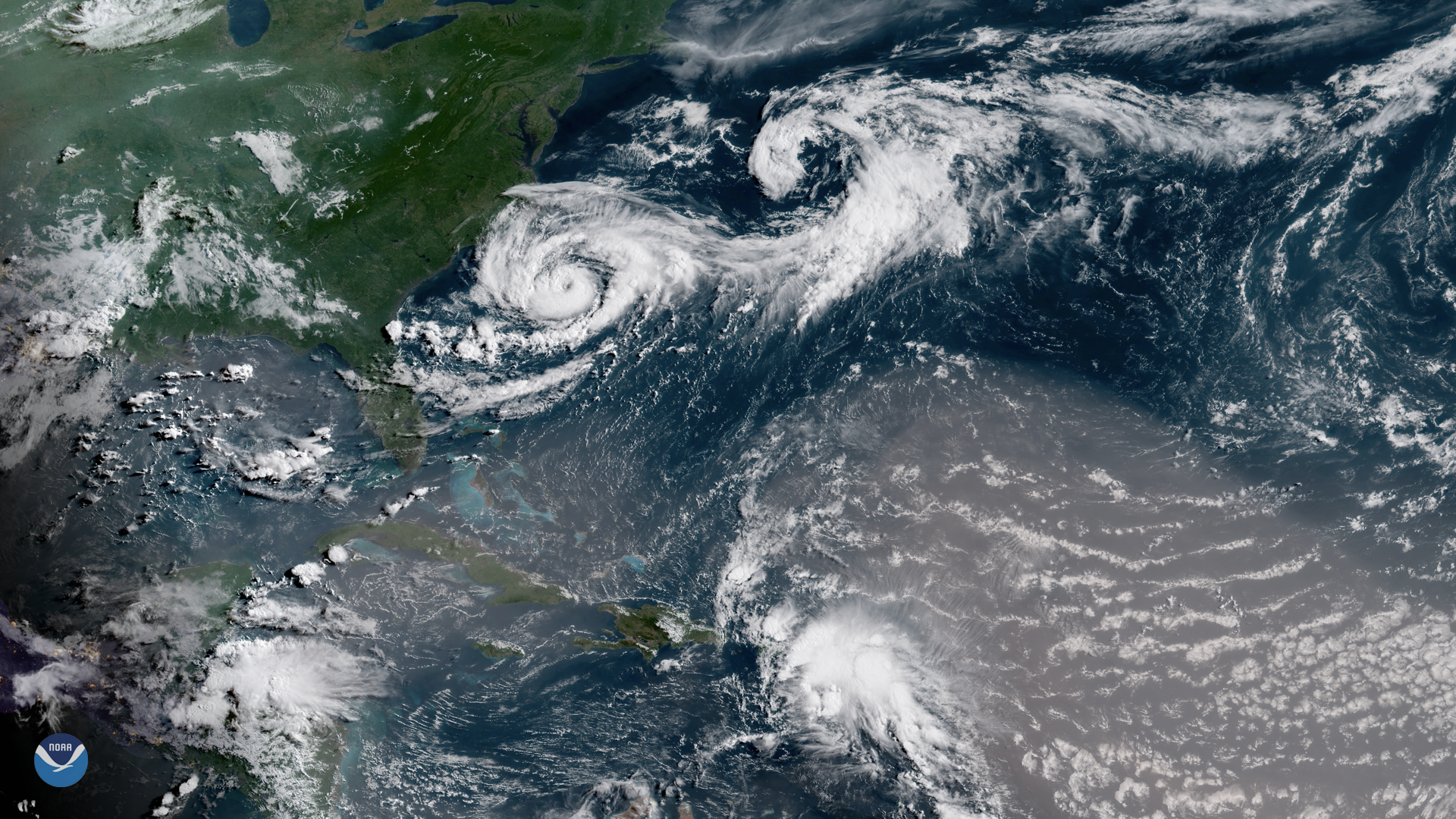
Satellite imagery showing Chris (top) and the remnants of Beryl (bottom) early on July 10

By late on July 10, a weakening mid-level ridge over the central Atlantic and a new trough over the northeastern United States began to accelerate the cyclone eastward. At 12:00 UTC on July 10, Chris became a hurricane as it moved quicker to the northeast. The storm's new movement forced the center out of the upwelled water, and Chris proceeded to rapidly intensify late on July 10. Chris peaked as a Category 2 hurricane with winds of 105 mph (165 km/h) and a pressure of 969 mbar (28.61 inHg) at 00:00 UTC on July 11, with the convective ring in its core transforming into a full eyewall. Early on July 11, Chris began weakening as it moved out of the Gulf Stream, with its eye being obscured by clouds. Although the eye briefly became visible again, it quickly disappeared beneath the clouds as the cyclone's structure slowly steadily degraded. The storm began extratropical transition late on July 11, with the rain shield expanding to the northwest quadrant. At 12:00 UTC on July 12, Chris weakened to a tropical storm, and six hours later, it transitioned to an extratropical cyclone a few hundred miles southeast of Newfoundland. The extratropical storm made landfall by 00:00 UTC on July 13 in Newfoundland and Labrador. The low continued northeastward over the Atlantic for the next few days, before weakening and finally dissipating southeast of Iceland on July 17.

== Preparations and impact ==
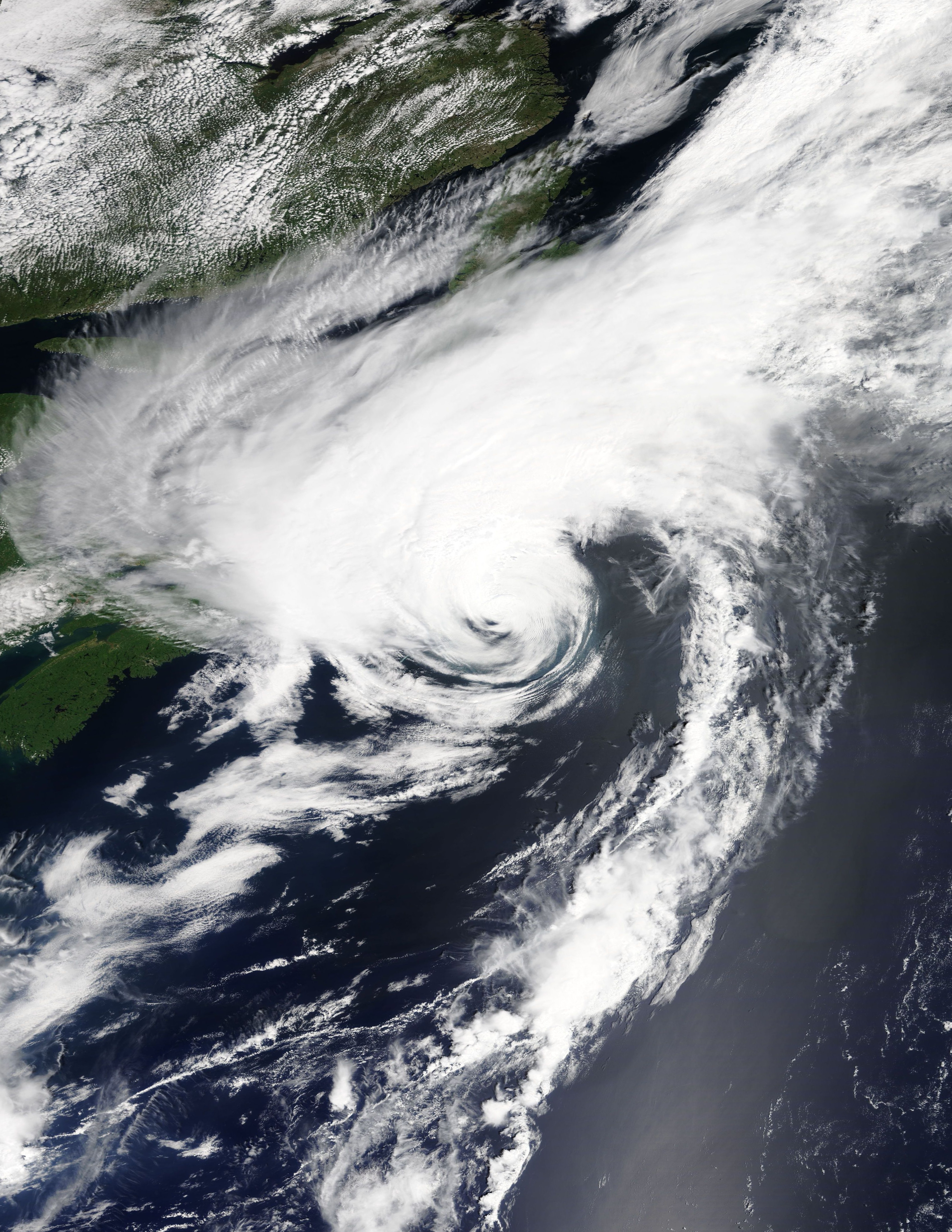
Chris affecting Canada after transitioning into an extratropical cyclone

While offshore, Chris brought large swells to the East Coast of the United States, sparking hundreds of water rescues, especially along the coasts of North Carolina, Maryland, New Jersey, and New England. "No swimming" signs were posted at beaches in the Outer Banks of North Carolina. More than 75 people had been rescued from Wrightsville Beach from July 4 to 8. On July 4, 24 people were rescued from Carolina Beach, and on July 6, 15 people were the same location. On July 7, a man drowned in rough seas attributed to the storm at Kill Devil Hills, North Carolina. A vacation home in Rodanthe was declared uninhabitable after swells generated by Chris eroded away the base of the building. In Maryland, more than 225 rescues were reported by beach patrol in Ocean City. On July 11, a Coastal Flood Advisory was issued for the Jersey Shore. Two teenage surfers rescued a swimmer caught by a rip current in New Jersey. In Spring Lake, volunteer lifeguards rescued a man from drowning. A High Surf Warning was issued for parts of coastal southern New England. Horseneck Beach State Reservation in Massachusetts was closed by the Department of Conservation and Recreation.

Before Chris hit Newfoundland and Labrador, ExxonMobil moved many non-essential employees working on offshore oil platforms out of the path of the storm. Simultaneously, BP Canada disconnected and moved the West Aquarius exploration drilling rig. Wind warnings were issued by Environment Canada for southeast Avalon and St. John's districts. In addition, rainfall warnings were in effect for much of southern Newfoundland. The mayor of St. John's ordered crews to be on standby. The city's public works department placed sandbags ahead of the cyclone. As an extratropical cyclone, the system brought high swells, locally heavy rain and gusty winds to Newfoundland and Labrador. Abnormally high water levels were recorded along the southern Avalon Peninsula with swells of 20 to 26 ft (6 to 8 m). Rainfall accumulations in Newfoundland and Labrador peaked at 3.0 in (76 mm) in Gander, while gusts reached 60 mph (96 km/h) in Ferryland. Rainfall accumulations in all of Canada was highest on Sable Island, at 4.39 in (111.6 mm). The brunt of the rain spared St. John's, with St. John's International Airport only getting 0.15 in (3.8 mm) of precipitation. However, the city still reported strong winds. Overall damage in Canada was minimal.

The Bermuda Weather Service deemed the storm a "potential threat" for thunderstorms, rip currents and high waves. The storm caused moderate showers from as it stalled to the southwest of the island. Rainfall peaked at 0.64 inches (16 mm) on July 9. The agency issued a small craft warning for the island on July 10; it was extended to July 11. Eventually, Chris passed a few hundred miles to the northwest on July 11, leaving little to no damage.

== See also ==
- Other storms of the same name
- List of Category 2 Atlantic hurricanes
- Hurricane Alex (2004) – took a similar track
- Hurricane Cristobal (2014) – took a similar track
- Hurricane Gert (2017) – took a similar track
