= Hurricane Beryl (2018) =

Category 1 Atlantic hurricane

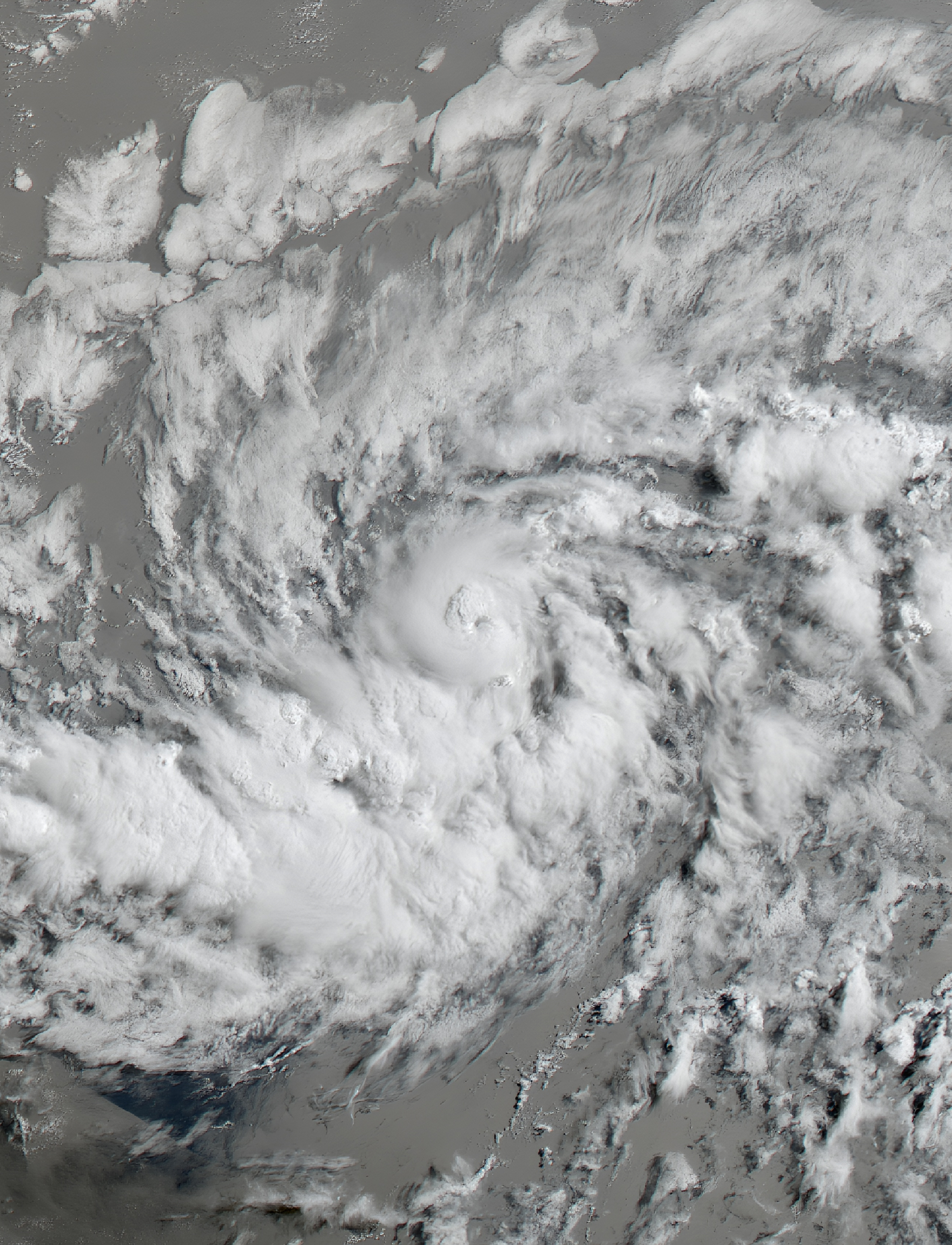
- Beryl shortly after peak intensity well to the east of the Lesser Antilles on July 6

Meteorological history
- Formed: July 4, 2018
- Remnant low: July 15, 2018
- Dissipated: July 17, 2018

Category 1 hurricane
- 1-minute sustained (SSHWS/NWS)
- Highest winds: 80 mph (130 km/h)
- Lowest pressure: 991 mbar (hPa); 29.26 inHg

Overall effects
- Fatalities: None
- Damage: >$1 million (2018 USD)
- Areas affected: Lesser Antilles, United States Virgin Islands, Puerto Rico, Hispaniola, Lucayan Archipelago, Bermuda, Atlantic Canada
- IBTrACS
- Part of the 2018 Atlantic hurricane season

Hurricane Beryl was a fast-moving and long-lived tropical cyclone. The second named storm and first hurricane of the 2018 Atlantic hurricane season, Beryl formed in the Main Development Region from a vigorous tropical wave that moved off the west coast of Africa on July 1. The wave quickly organized into a tropical depression over the central Atlantic Ocean on July 4. Rapid intensification took place and the depression quickly became a tropical storm at 00:00 UTC the next day. Just less than 15 hours later, on July 6, Beryl strengthened into the first hurricane of the season, reaching its peak intensity on July 6. Increasingly unfavorable conditions caused a rapid deterioration of the cyclone shortly after its peak, with Beryl falling to tropical storm status on the next day, as it began to accelerate towards the Caribbean. Late on July 8, it degenerated into a tropical wave shortly before reaching the Lesser Antilles. The remnants were monitored for several days, although they failed to organize significantly until July 14, when it regenerated into a subtropical storm, six days after it lost tropical characteristics. However, the newly reformed storm quickly lost convection, and it degenerated into a remnant low early on July 16, while situated over the Gulf Stream. Beryl subsequently dissipated on the next day.

Many places in Beryl's track were still recovering from hurricanes Irma and Maria, which hit the Eastern Caribbean in September 2017; structures were left deficient to strong winds. Beryl prompted multiple islands in the Lesser Antilles to issue warnings and watches, including a hurricane watch as it was initially expected to pass through the islands of Dominica and Guadeloupe as a hurricane. The storm weakened faster than expected and Beryl degenerated into a tropical wave before it reached the islands, though minimal effects were still felt across the eastern Caribbean. Beryl's remnants caused flash flooding and landslides across the island of Puerto Rico, and several people were trapped in their houses by floodwaters; approximately 47,000 lost power on the island. In the Dominican Republic, 9 in (230 mm) of rain caused rivers to overflow, and more than 130,000 customers lost power. Minor impacts were reported in the Lucayan Archipelago, Bermuda, and Atlantic Canada. Overall damage was estimated to be in the millions, and no fatalities were reported.

== Meteorological history ==
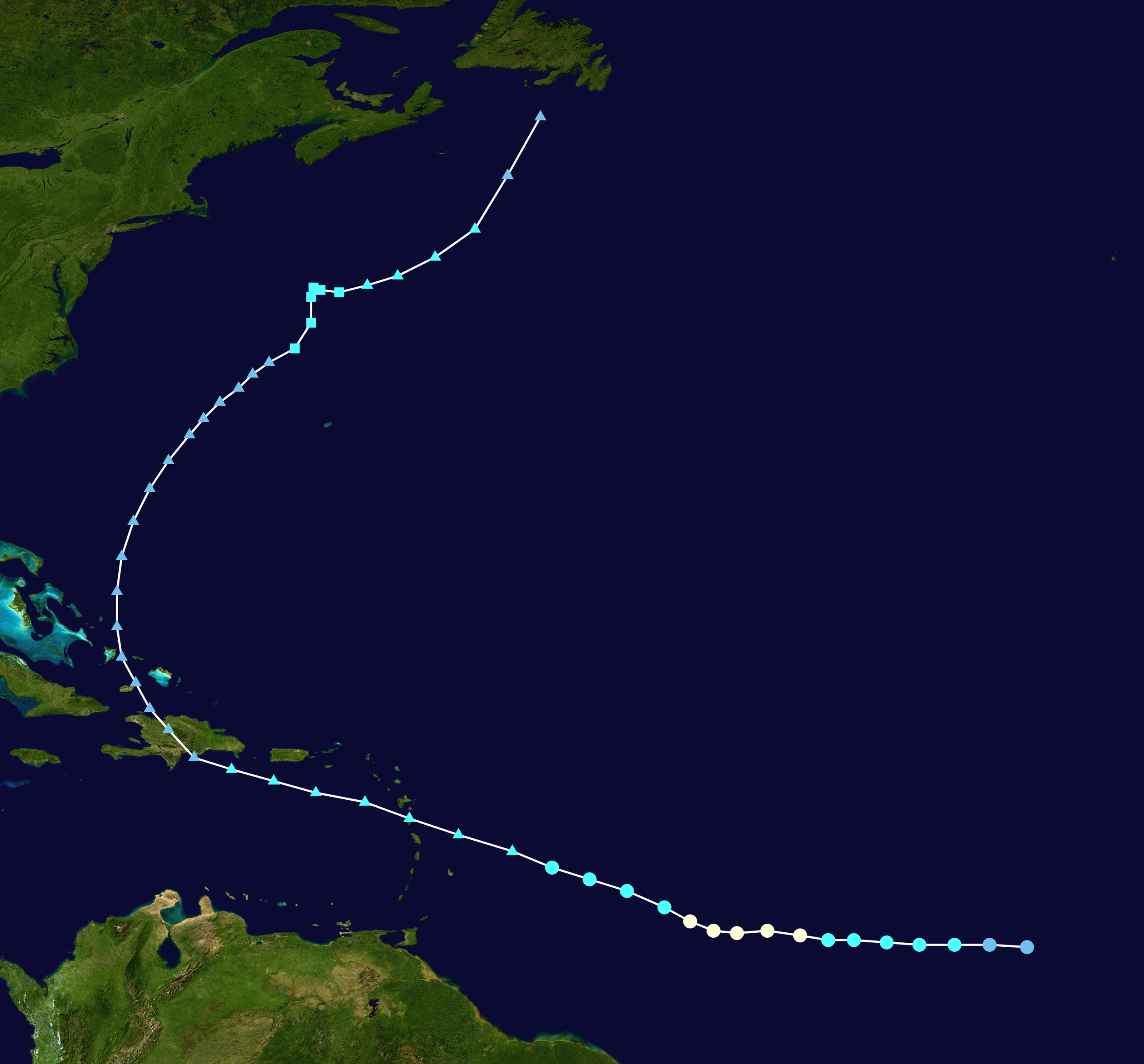
Map plotting the storm's track and intensity, according to the Saffir–Simpson scale Map key Saffir–Simpson scale Tropical depression (≤38 mph, ≤62 km/h) Tropical storm (39–73 mph, 63–118 km/h) Category 1 (74–95 mph, 119–153 km/h) Category 2 (96–110 mph, 154–177 km/h) Category 3 (111–129 mph, 178–208 km/h) Category 4 (130–156 mph, 209–251 km/h) Category 5 (≥157 mph, ≥252 km/h) Unknown Storm type Tropical cyclone Subtropical cyclone Extratropical cyclone, remnant low, tropical disturbance, or monsoon depression

A vigorous tropical wave with a large amount of convection, or thunderstorms, moved off the coast of Africa on July 1. However, most of the convective activity diminished as it moved west-southwestwards. Late on July 3, the NHC began tracking this disturbance while it was over the eastern tropical Atlantic for tropical cyclogenesis. The wave quickly organized over the next two days, with a concentrated area of thunderstorms over the low-level center and rainbands developing over the southern side of the disturbance. At 12:00 UTC on July 4, the wave organized into a tropical depression about 1,500 miles (1,300 nautical miles) west-southwest of the Cape Verde Islands. At 00:00 UTC on July 5, the depression strengthened into Tropical Storm Beryl while located at 10.1°N 38.0°W; this was farther southeast than any other Atlantic cyclone on record so early in the calendar year. Due to its very small size, Beryl was prone to very quick changes in intensity, as the storm's tiny inner core could quickly spin up or spin down, depending on the atmospheric conditions. A mid-level eye becoming apparent as the system was consolidating on July 5. Despite relatively cool waters, Beryl began a period of rapid intensification late on July 5. The storm developed a 5 nmi (9.3 km) pinhole eye under a central dense overcast. Beryl strengthened into a hurricane at 06:00 UTC on July 6, becoming the fourth-earliest hurricane to form in the tropical Atlantic Ocean, behind the 1933 Trinidad hurricane, a hurricane coincidentally with the same name in 2024, and Hurricane Elsa of 2021, and the easternmost Atlantic hurricane to form from a tropical wave prior to the month of August since reliable records began in 1850. Simultaneously, the small cyclone's pinhole eye became visible.

Throughout the day, the strengthening trend leveled off, and Beryl's eye became cloud-filled. By 21:00 UTC on July 6, Beryl lost its pinhole eye as it tracked towards an environment of higher wind shear. The storm began to gain latitude on July 7, as the storm began losing organization. Dry air began to infiltrate the core of the hurricane, causing its center to become exposed, and Beryl soon weakened back to a tropical storm at 12:00 UTC on July 7. Beryl continued to quickly weaken as it accelerated towards the west-northwest. This trend of rapid weakening continued as wind shear increased upon the system, reducing the storm's structure into a swirl of mid- and low-level clouds. An Air Force Hurricane Hunter aircraft found no evidence of a closed circulation center, and radar from Martinique found no little to no circulation within the bursts of convection. Thus, at 12:00 UTC on July 8, Beryl degenerated into an open trough while located just 60 miles northeast of Martinique. The NHC opted to continue advisories, however, as it was impacting Dominica, discontinuing them afterwards. The National Hurricane Center noted that Beryl had a chance to redevelop near The Bahamas after wind shear decreased.

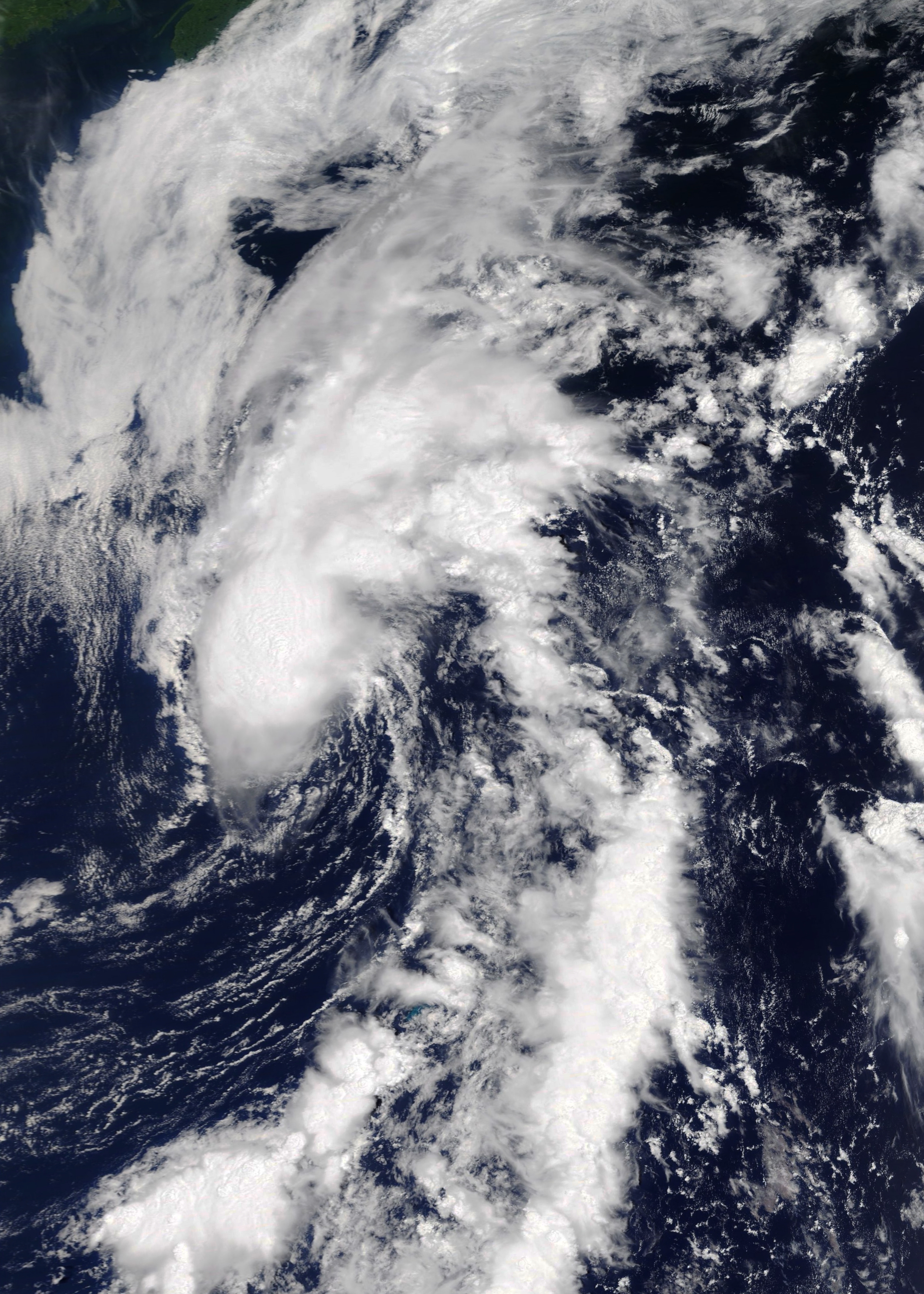
Subtropical Storm Beryl at its secondary peak intensity on July 14

The remnants continued moving westward into the eastern Caribbean while continuing to have tropical storm-force winds, due to a vigorous mid-level circulation. After passing south of Puerto Rico, the remnants eventually moved ashore in the Dominican Republic with gale-force winds, early on July 10. Strong upper-level winds prevented any redevelopment of the remnants of Beryl for several days as it moved across the island, and as it passed through the Bahamas into the Western Atlantic. The remnants moved northward and then northeastward around a subtropical ridge. As Beryl's remnants were located over the Bahamas, they became elongated and stretched several hundred miles across. By July 13, however, conditions became slightly more favorable for redevelopment, and the remnants of Beryl spawned a new circulation near the associated thunderstorms, though the remnants remained too disorganized for redevelopment at the time.

The circulation became well-defined early on July 14, and due to influence from a baroclinic trough, thunderstorms developed and persisted near the storm's center, with gale-force winds detected east of the center. After continued reorganization, Beryl was re-designated as a subtropical storm at 12:00 UTC that day, while located well off the East Coast of the United States. While convection and the strongest winds were near the center, the storm was deemed subtropical due it interacting with the upper-level trough. Convection decreased somewhat after Beryl was redesignated, though the remaining convection organized into a curved rainband. Beryl's center possibly reformed to the north into the rainband. Beryl reached its secondary peak intensity soon afterward, at 00:00 UTC on July 15, with maximum winds of 40 mph (64 km/h) and a pressure of 1,005 mbar (29.7 inHg). However, the rejuvenated storm soon began to weaken as nearby dry air intruded and weakened showers and thunderstorms associated with the storm, and impinging northwesterly shear further served to remove thunderstorm activity. Early on July 15, water vapor imagery indicated that Beryl had become fully intertwined with and embedded within a cold-core low, causing the subtropical cyclone to slow down drastically over the warm waters of the Gulf Stream. This incited thunderstorm formation, with an eye-like feature forming, surrounded by a "small donut ring" of convection. Later that day, however, Beryl degraded to a low to mid-level swirl of shallow clouds, while continuing on a northeastward course. After lacking thunderstorm activity near the center for twelve hours, Beryl degenerated into a remnant low at 03:00 UTC on July 16. Beryl's remnant low subsequently degenerated into a trough just south of Newfoundland on the next day.

== Preparations and impact ==
The remnants of Beryl damaged or destroyed more than 2,000 structures. Total damage from the storm was estimated to be in the millions (2018 USD).

=== Lesser Antilles ===
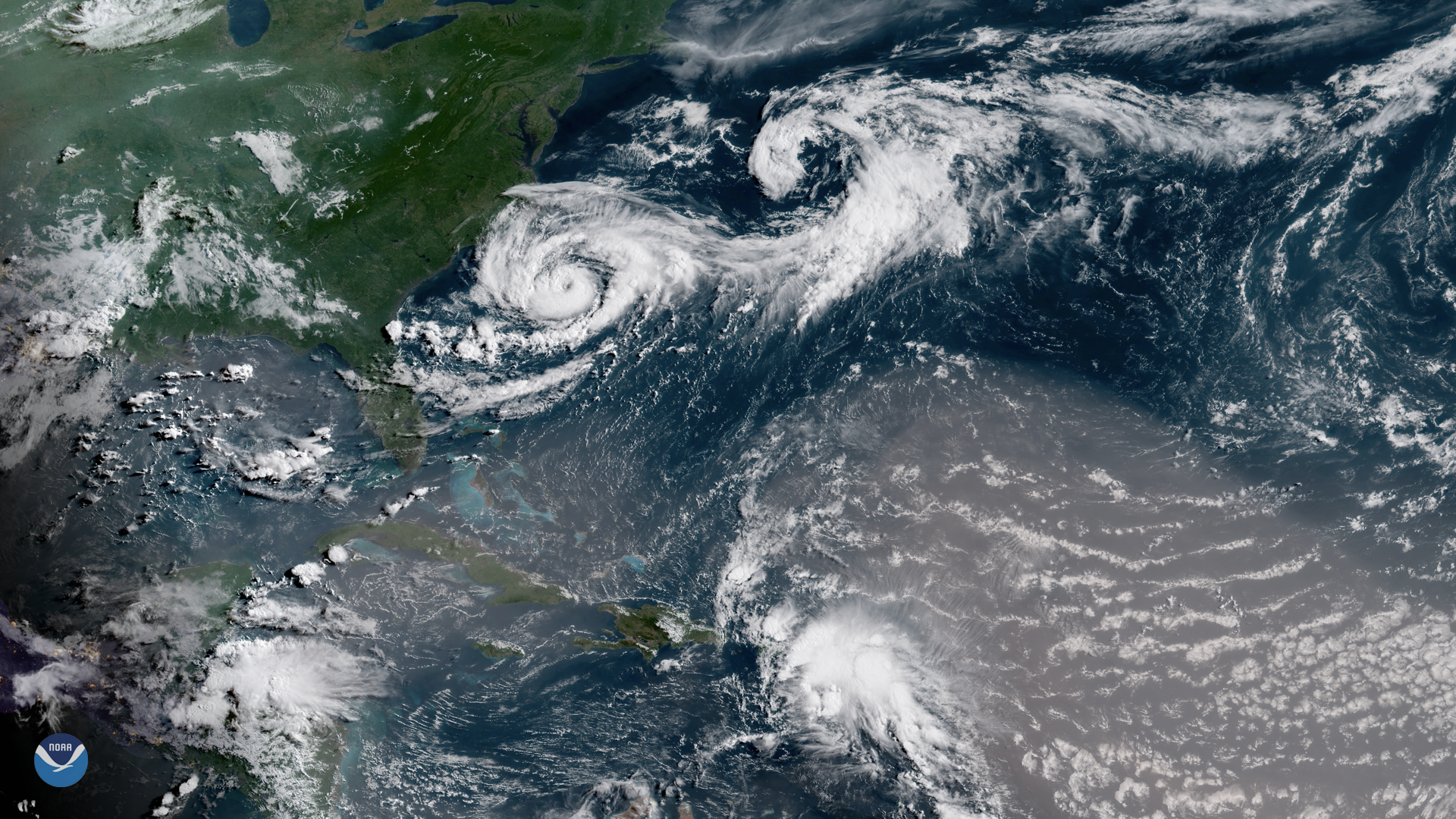
Remnants of Beryl over Puerto Rico on July 9, with Hurricane Chris appearing off of the United States East Coast

On July 6, the Government of France issued a tropical storm watch for its overseas collective Saint Barthélemy. On July 7, the Government of France issued a tropical storm watch for Guadeloupe and its overseas collective Saint Martin in the Leeward Islands. In preparation for the hurricane's arrival, the Government of Barbados issued a hurricane watch for Dominica in the Windward Islands and a tropical storm watch for Barbados in the Lesser Antilles on July 6. At the same time, the Government of St. Lucia issued a tropical storm watch for St. Lucia. Earlier, France had issued a tropical storm watch for Martinique, also in the Windward Islands. The next day, the Government of Barbados replaced the hurricane watch with a tropical storm warning as Beryl weakened before making landfall. On July 8, the Government of Dominica ordered a curfew and declared a state of emergency ahead of the storm's passage. Dominican prime minister Roosevelt Skerrit told people to store water since the government shut down the water system as a protective measure. Skerrit said in a public address, "We have to continue to take the situation very seriously.[...]Move now. Go to your relatives.[...]Go to the shelters." Workmen at a resort in Dominica fortified the roofs on the cottages that survived Hurricane Maria.

Beryl brought heavy rain and thunderstorms to Guadeloupe. Thunderstorms began on the evening of July 9 and lasted throughout the night. Localized amounts of 3.9 in (100 mm) were reported throughout the island. Rainfall peaked at 7.8 in (199 mm) in Saint-Claude; wind gusts averaged 50 to 56 mph (80 to 90 km/h) island-wide with a peak of 62 mph (99 km/h) in Le Moule. The resulting damage was limited, with some trees and power lines downed and localized flooding from runoff. The island remained on an Orange Warning until July 10, after the bulk of the rain passed due to a threat for isolated squally weather. Impacts in Dominica was minimal, with no flooding reported.

=== U.S. Caribbean territories ===
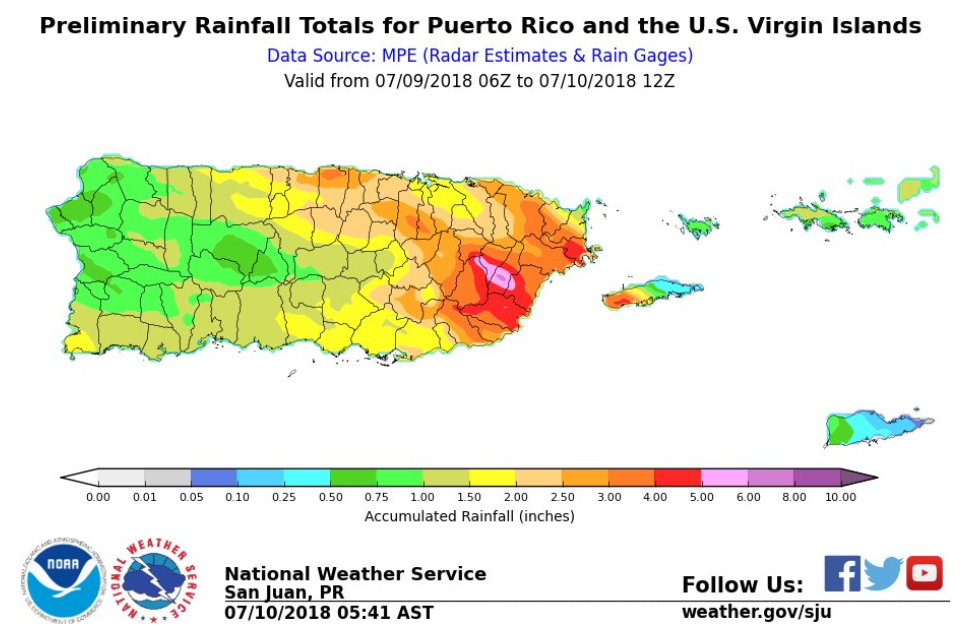
Preliminary rainfall totals for Puerto Rico and the U.S. Virgin Islands. The darker the color, the more rain that fell.

Flash flood watches and warnings were issued for most of the island of Puerto Rico by the National Weather Service in San Juan. On July 6, the Governor of Puerto Rico, Ricardo Rosselló, issued a state of emergency for the island, amid concerns that enhanced rainfall from Beryl or its remnants could lead to flash floods and mudslides, damaging infrastructure that was still recovering from hurricanes Irma and Maria from the previous season. Governor Rosselló reported that work will be suspended on July 9 for public employees. The governor and the Emergency Management and Disaster Administration met with mayors of cities and towns to discuss preparations ahead of the storm. The government opened 42 shelters for citizens to obtain relief from Beryl due to the demand of mayors around the territory. Long lines were reported at supermarkets as people shopped for food and water. Puerto Rican residents were filled with anxiety leading up to the storm. A government mental-health hotline recorded a spike in calls in the days leading up to the storm. The Environmental Protection Agency (EPA) and FEMA staff monitored Beryl in case it made landfall in Puerto Rico and the United States Virgin Islands (USVI). The EPA and FEMA worked with the government of Puerto Rico and the USVI to rebuild structures damaged by Hurricane Maria and prepare residents for Beryl and future storms. The EPA stationed approximately 60 employees in Puerto Rico and the USVI.

Mass power outages were reported on the U.S. Virgin Island of St. Croix, and officials ordered closures of schools and government offices. Due to the effects of previous Hurricanes Irma and Maria, over 60,000 people in Puerto Rico had blue tarps provided by FEMA as temporary roofs. However, tarps were easily blown off due to strong wind gusts from Beryl's remnants. Lieutenant Governor Luis Rivera Marín reported that some rivers began flooding by noon local time on July 9. Rainfall was the heaviest in Eastern Puerto Rico, where over 8 inches of rain fell. The enhanced rainfall also triggered flash flooding that closed several roadways and downed several trees. A landslide was reported in the town of Naranjito, although there were no reports of fatalities or injuries. A tree was blown down onto a road in Guayama. Floodwaters entered a residence in Las Piedras, trapping three people. The Fajardo River overflowed its banks, causing a road to be impassable. Vehicles were trapped on Puerto Rico Highway 909 near Humacao after the road was inundated by floodwaters. By the time the storm passed, approximately 47,000 Puerto Ricans lost power on the island as a result of gusty winds from squalls.

=== Dominican Republic ===
On July 10, the Dominican Republic Emergency Operations Center issued a red alert for the provinces of San Cristóbal, Greater Santo Domingo, and San Jose de Ocoa and a yellow alert for ten additional provinces. 104 people were evacuated and moved to the homes of relatives. More than 5,000 government workers were put on standby to respond to flooding.

Heavy rainfall caused by the remnants of Beryl flooded hundreds of homes in the Dominican Republic. Countrywide, the Emergency Operations Center reported that the floods left around 11,740 people displaced. In addition, 19 communities were reported isolated due to flooding; 1,586 homes were damaged with four destroyed. Three bridges were damaged. The National Institute of Potable Waters and Sewers reported that 75 aqueducts were out of service due to the floods. Electrical companies reported that 138,948 customers were affected, mostly in Greater Santo Domingo and San Pedro de Macorís. A peak rainfall amount of 9.2 in (230 mm) fell in the country, far exceeding the 4 in (100 mm) forecast by the National Meteorological Office (Onamet).

The floods left 130,000 people in the capital city of Santo Domingo without power. The National District received 9.1 in (230 mm) of rain in the first eight hours. Several sectors of the capital were flooded, and deficiencies in the drainage system in Greater Santo Domingo led major roadways and highways to be inundated. In San Cristóbal Province, the worst hit areas included the Municipality of Villa Altagracia, and other areas near the Haina River. A peak rainfall amount of 4.2 in (106 mm) was recorded. The Haina River overflowed, causing flooding up to roof height in some areas such as Manoguayabo, where emergency rescues were carried out. The governor of the province reported that 700 homes were flooded and the walls of two schools collapsed amid heavy rains and winds. The floods left 900 people displaced and floodwaters at a police station were knee-high. The winds and downpours caused the diversion of two flights coming from South America to the Las Américas International Airport as well as the delay of the departure of several flights to the United States.

=== Elsewhere ===
The remnants of Beryl caused locally heavy rainfall in The Bahamas. NASA's Global Precipitation Measurement mission core satellite found scattered thunderstorms causing torrential rainfall on some of the islands. The satellite estimated rainfall at a rate of more than 1.6 in (41 mm) on Crooked Island. As Beryl was redeveloping near Bermuda, a peak rainfall amount of 0.24 in (6.1 mm) was recorded, along with a peak wind gust of 37 mph (60 km/h). Post-Tropical Storm Beryl had little impact on Canada, as it mainly affected marine areas with winds below gale-force. No precipitation directly related to Beryl affected southeastern Newfoundland.

== See also ==
- Weather of 2018
- Other tropical cyclones named Beryl
- List of Category 1 Atlantic hurricanes
- Hurricanes in Hispaniola
- Tropical Storm Erika (2009) – affected similar areas also as a tropical wave.
- Hurricane Danny (2015) – another small tropical cyclone that rapidly developed.
- Hurricane Elsa (2021) – another early-season hurricane that impacted the Antilles.
