= Hurricane Gert (2017) =

Category 2 Atlantic hurricane

- Gert at peak intensity south of Nova Scotia on August 16

Meteorological history
- Formed: August 12, 2017
- Extratropical: August 17, 2017
- Dissipated: August 18, 2017

Category 2 hurricane
- 1-minute sustained (SSHWS/NWS)
- Highest winds: 110 mph (175 km/h)
- Lowest pressure: 962 mbar (hPa); 28.41 inHg

Overall effects
- Fatalities: 2
- Damage: Minimal
- Areas affected: Eastern United States, Atlantic Canada, Ireland, United Kingdom
- IBTrACS
- Part of the 2017 Atlantic hurricane season

Hurricane Gert was a strong tropical cyclone that brought heavy surf and rip currents to the East Coast of the United States in August 2017. Gert originated from a tropical wave that moved off the coast of Africa on August 3 yet failed to organize significantly until August 12, when the system coalesced into a tropical depression east of the Bahamas. A few hours later, the depression became the seventh tropical storm of the annual hurricane season and was named Gert. For the next day, though, further intensification was hindered by the proximity of dry air. Once Gert was able to overcome that on August 14, however, Gert resumed strengthening while moving northwards, paralleling the United States coastline. Gert reached its peak intensity on August 16 at Category 2 status on the Saffir–Simpson scale as it accelerated northeastwards. Thereafter, increasing vertical wind shear and decreasing sea surface temperatures caused Gert to rapidly weaken and transition into an extratropical cyclone on August 17, well east of Atlantic Canada. The remnants of Gert dissipated late on August 18, after they merged with another extratropical cyclone over the open Atlantic.

During its lifetime, Gert brought heavy swells, rough surf, and rip currents to the East Coast of the United States and Atlantic Canada. Two fatalities occurred when two swimmers drowned amid heavy surf. The extratropical system that merged with the remnants of Gert went on to bring strong winds and rain to Ireland and parts of the United Kingdom.

== Meteorological history ==
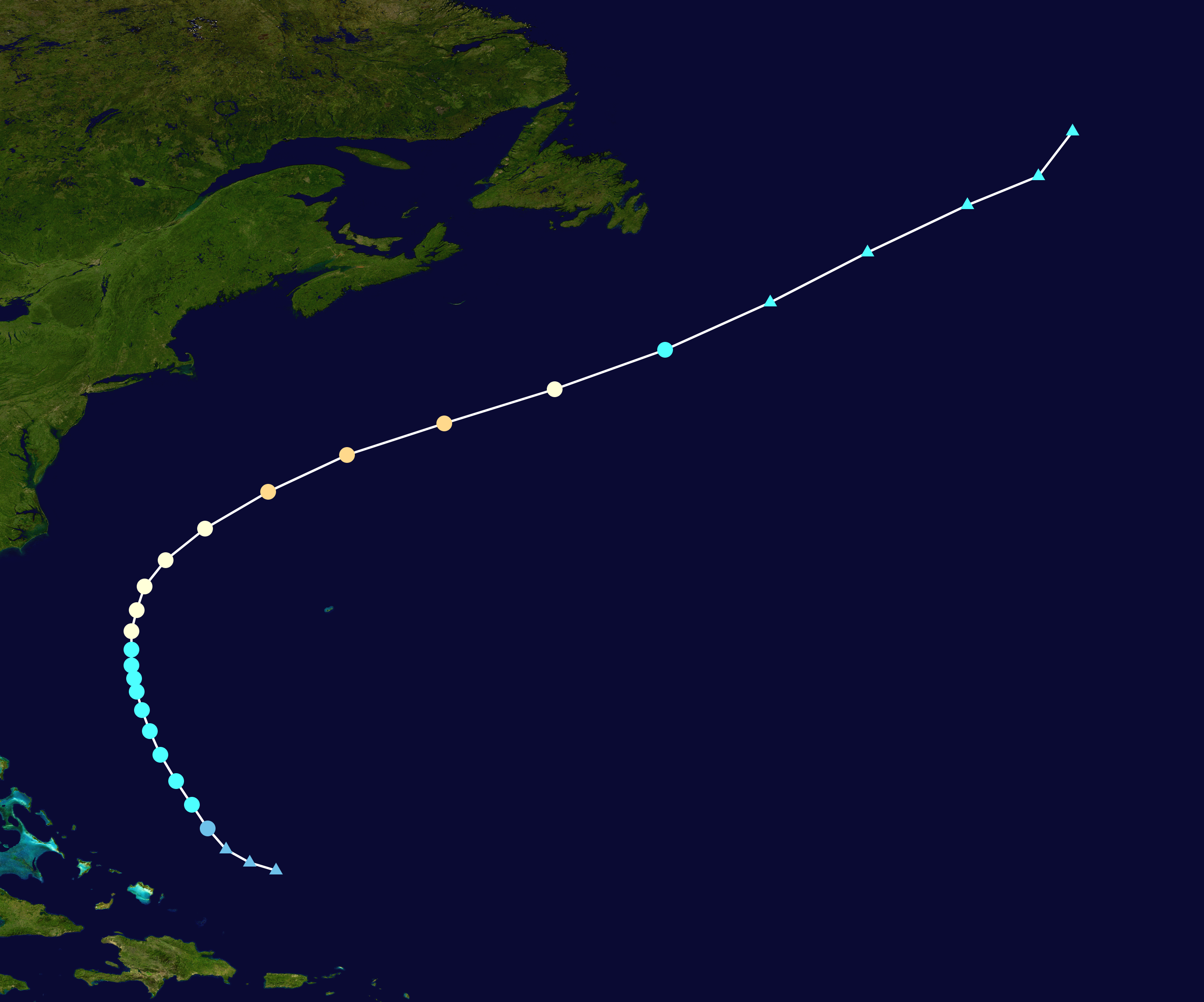
Map plotting the storm's track and intensity, according to the Saffir–Simpson scale Map key Saffir–Simpson scale Tropical depression (≤38 mph, ≤62 km/h) Tropical storm (39–73 mph, 63–118 km/h) Category 1 (74–95 mph, 119–153 km/h) Category 2 (96–110 mph, 154–177 km/h) Category 3 (111–129 mph, 178–208 km/h) Category 4 (130–156 mph, 209–251 km/h) Category 5 (≥157 mph, ≥252 km/h) Unknown Storm type Tropical cyclone Subtropical cyclone Extratropical cyclone, remnant low, tropical disturbance, or monsoon depression

On August 2, the National Hurricane Center (NHC) began to track a tropical wave over western Africa. The wave emerged over the Atlantic Ocean on August 3, accompanied by a weak surface low-pressure area. While moving quickly westwards south of Cape Verde in a generally favorable environment characterized by high sea surface temperatures (SSTs) and low vertical wind shear, the wave showed some signs of development, and was given a high chance of consolidating into a tropical depression during the next five days by the NHC. However, by August 5, the system's swift movement brought it into less favorable conditions, causing most of the wave's associated showers and thunderstorms to dissipate. The wave continued to track westwards over the next few days, eventually splitting into two systems—the northern one being the precursor to Gert, and the southern portion later spawning Hurricane Kenneth in the Eastern Pacific.

Afterwards, the precursor to Gert moved west-northwestwards, passing north of Puerto Rico on August 11. As it did so, convective bands associated with the system began to curve and concentrate towards the center of the system, evidencing increasing organization. A surface low-pressure area developed on August 12, and a tropical depression formed at 18:00 UTC that same day 265 miles (426 km) northeast of the Turks and Caicos Islands. The depression organized further to become a tropical storm at 00:00 UTC on August 13, bearing maximum sustained winds of 40 mph (64 km/h), and received the name Gert. Although conditions generally favored further intensification, with high SSTs and low wind shear, mid-level dry air disrupted Gert's central convection, causing Gert's intensity to hold steady for the next 18 hours. However, by August 14, Gert's circulation had mixed out the dry air, poising the storm for further strengthening. At that time, Gert was moving north-northwestwards to northwards through a gap in the subtropical ridge.

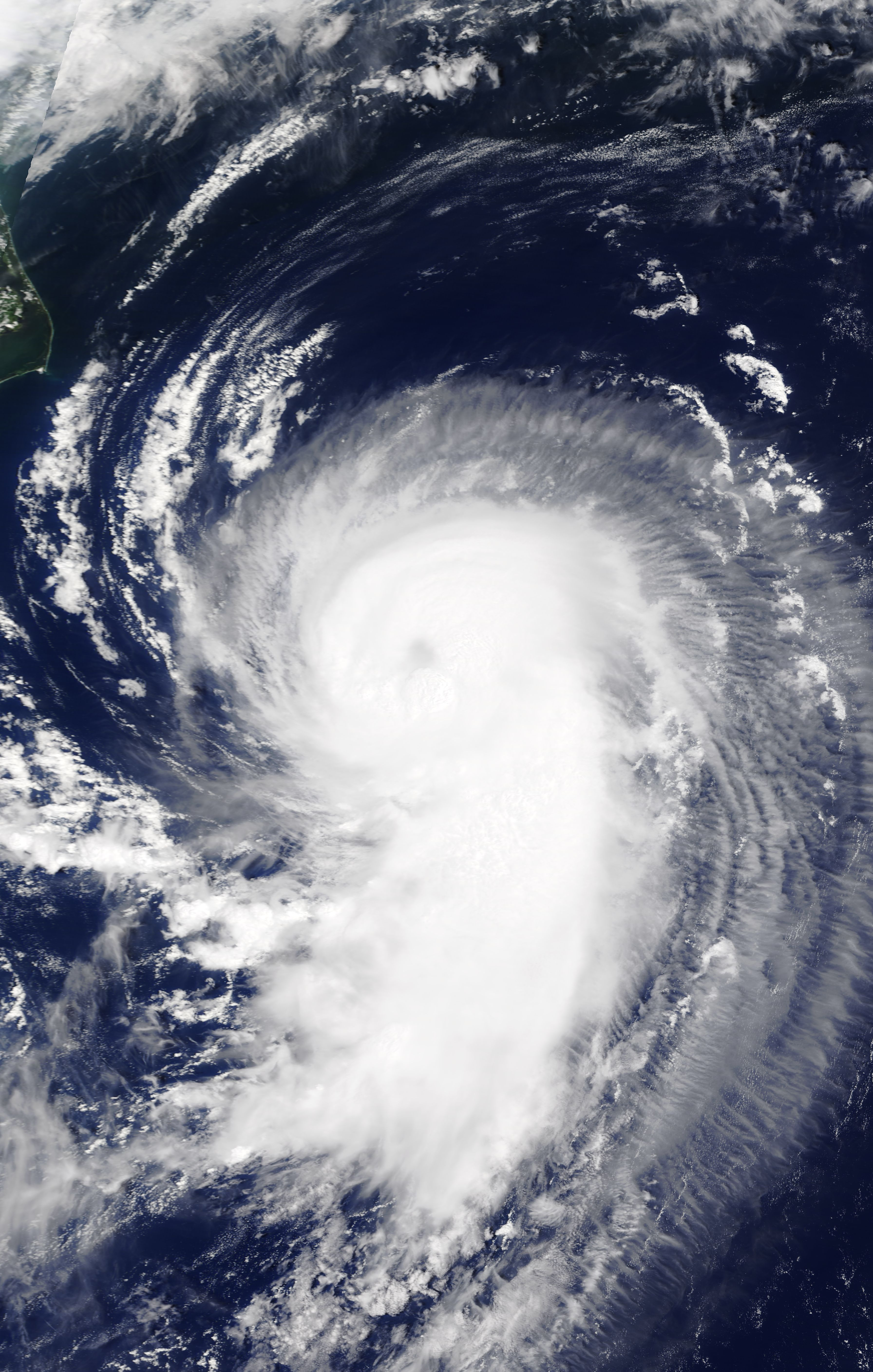
Hurricane Gert off the United States East Coast on August 15

From August 14 onwards, Gert strengthened markedly, developing persistent deep convection and a central dense overcast. At 06:00 UTC on August 15, Gert became the second hurricane of the 2017 Atlantic hurricane season as sustained winds rose to 75 mph (121 km/h). While an approaching mid-latitude trough began to accelerate Gert towards the northeast, Gert continued to intensify, developing an eye just 10 nautical miles (12 mi; 19 km) across. At 18:00 UTC on August 16, Gert reached its peak intensity with winds of 110 mph (180 km/h) and a minimum central pressure of 962 mbar (962 hPa; 28.4 inHg), ranked as Category 2 on the Saffir–Simpson scale. Racing off to the east-northeast, Gert soon passed beyond the northern wall of the Gulf Stream, marking a significant decrease in SSTs. Compounded by increasing vertical wind shear and drier air, Gert began to weaken and its cloud pattern rapidly deteriorated; the system degraded to a tropical storm by 12:00 UTC on August 17. Six hours later, Gert transitioned into an extratropical cyclone 335 miles (539 km) southeast of St. John's, Newfoundland. The weakening cyclone continued northeast over the open Atlantic Ocean, before dissipating by 00:00 UTC on August 19. The remnant energy and moisture of the system merged with another extratropical cyclone to the northwest, which later went on to affect Ireland and the United Kingdom.

== Preparations and impact ==
While Gert did not approach any land areas during its lifetime as a tropical cyclone, Gert still generated heavy swells, rough surf, and rip currents along the East Coast of the United States and Atlantic Canada. At Nantucket, Massachusetts, several beaches were closed, and lifeguards conducted more than 25 water rescues on August 16 alone. Despite this, a 40-year-old man drowned off Nobadeer Beach around noon on August 16; attempts to revive him after he was pulled from the water with CPR were not successful. In the Outer Banks off Cape Hatteras National Seashore, a 63-year-old man drowned on August 14 after being caught in a rip current during an attempt to rescue another swimmer "in distress". The other swimmer later returned safely to shore.

The remnants of Gert merged with another extratropical cyclone that produced strong winds and heavy rain in Ireland and the United Kingdom. Ahead of the storm, Met Éireann issued yellow weather warnings for the entirety of Ireland, expecting heavy showers and localized flooding. As the storm hit, severe floods occurred in Northern Ireland, with floodwaters reaching 1.5 m (4 ft 11 in). More than 100 people were rescued after being trapped in their cars or houses overnight.

== See also ==
- Other tropical cyclones named Gert
- Weather of 2017
- Tropical cyclones in 2017
- Hurricane Alex (2004) – Category 3 hurricane that took a similar path.
- Hurricane Chris (2018) – Hurricane of similar intensity that caused enhanced surf and swells along the United States East Coast.
