= Tropical Storm Chris (1988) =

Atlantic tropical storm in 1988

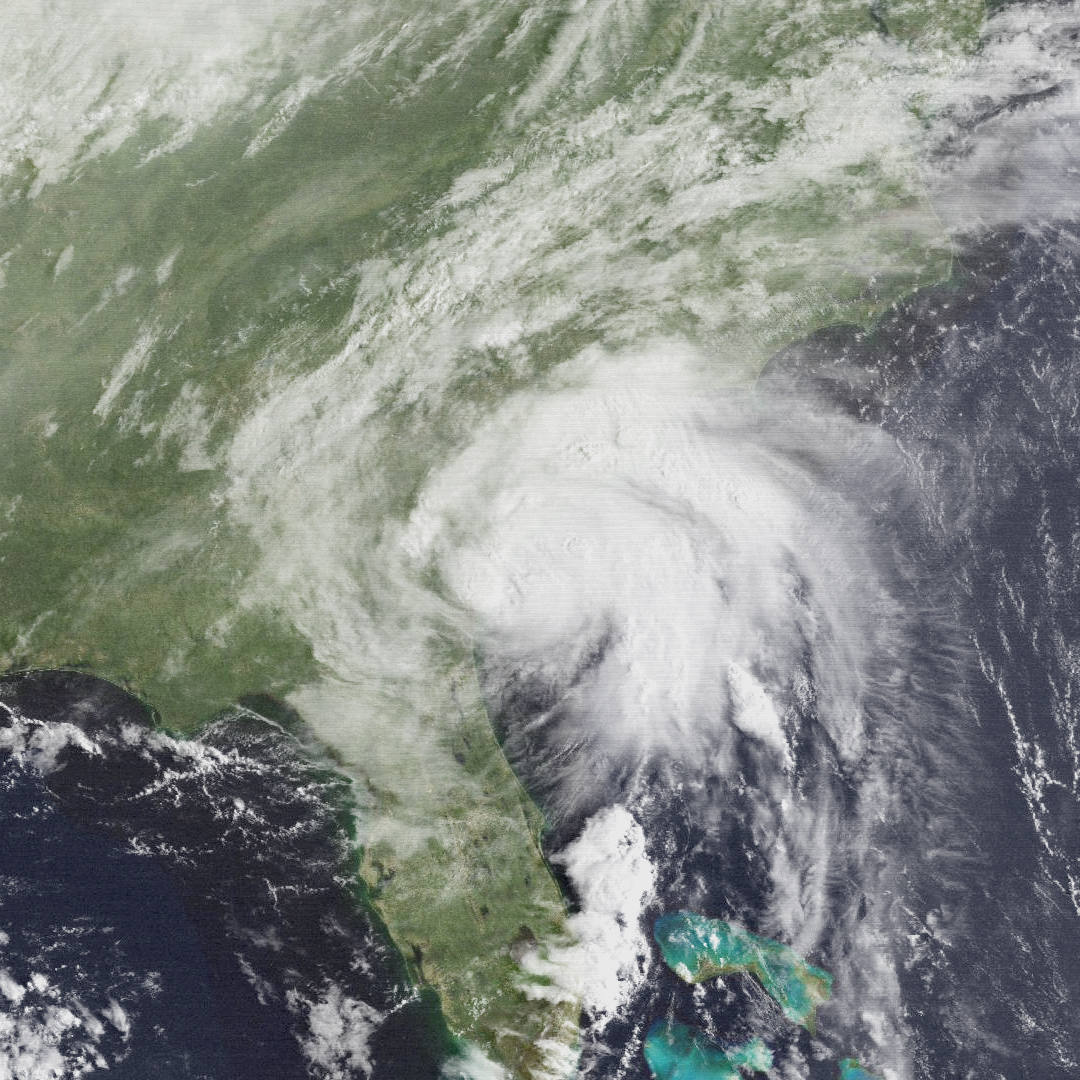
- Tropical Storm Chris at peak intensity near landfall in Georgia on August 28

Meteorological history
- Formed: August 21, 1988
- Extratropical: August 30, 1988
- Dissipated: August 30, 1988

Tropical storm
- 1-minute sustained (SSHWS/NWS)
- Highest winds: 50 mph (85 km/h)
- Lowest pressure: 1005 mbar (hPa); 29.68 inHg

Overall effects
- Fatalities: 6
- Damage: $2.2 million (1988 USD)
- Areas affected: Leeward Islands, Puerto Rico, Hispaniola, Florida, Georgia, South Carolina, North Carolina, Virginia, New England, Atlantic Canada
- IBTrACS
- Part of the 1988 Atlantic hurricane season

Tropical Storm Chris caused minor flooding in the Greater Antilles and the Eastern United States in August 1988. The seventh tropical cyclone and third named storm of the annual hurricane season, Chris developed from a tropical wave while roughly midway between Africa and the Lesser Antilles on August 21. Forming as a tropical depression, it remained weak for several days, crossing the Lesser Antilles, Hispaniola, and The Bahamas during this time. While offshore the coast of Florida on August 28, the depression intensified into Tropical Storm Chris. Thereafter, the system tracked rapidly north-northwestward and came ashore near Savannah, Georgia later that day. Once inland, Chris quickly weakened, and by early on the following day, it weakened to a tropical depression over South Carolina. Six hours later, Chris was absorbed by a cold front while over North Carolina, though the remnants of the system tracked across the Eastern United States and Atlantic Canada before dissipating on August 30.

In the Leeward Islands and U.S. Virgin Islands, Chris produced only light rainfall, that caused no damage or fatalities. Heavy rainfall occurred in Puerto Rico, which damaged 100 homes and caused three fatalities. Large amounts of precipitation also fell in Hispaniola, though no damage was reported. In the United States, much of the damage occurred due to tornadoes, especially in The Carolinas. A tornado in South Carolina destroyed at least 15 mobile homes, caused one fatality, and resulted in a brief shutdown of U.S. Route 301. Flooding was minimal, as rainfall totals amounted to 5 inches (130 mm) or less, though standing water was reported on Interstate 26. Another destructive tornado occurred in Virginia. Two additional deaths were reported in New York, two from drowning and one from a tree falling onto a car. Although winds were light, at least 118,000 people from South Carolina to Maine were left without electricity. The dissipating storm produced light winds and precipitation in Nova Scotia. Overall, Tropical Storm Chris was attributed to four fatalities and $2.25 million (1988 USD) in losses.

== Meteorological history ==
Map plotting the storm's track and intensity, according to the Saffir–Simpson scale Map key Saffir–Simpson scale Tropical depression (≤38 mph, ≤62 km/h) Tropical storm (39–73 mph, 63–118 km/h) Category 1 (74–95 mph, 119–153 km/h) Category 2 (96–110 mph, 154–177 km/h) Category 3 (111–129 mph, 178–208 km/h) Category 4 (130–156 mph, 209–251 km/h) Category 5 (≥157 mph, ≥252 km/h) Unknown Storm type Tropical cyclone Subtropical cyclone Extratropical cyclone, remnant low, tropical disturbance, or monsoon depression

A tropical wave emerged into the Atlantic from the west coast of Africa on August 15. Six days later, the system developed into Tropical Depression Seven while centered halfway between the Lesser Antilles and Africa. The depression tracked west-northwestward around the periphery of a subtropical surface high pressure ridge. After strengthening minimally, the depression struck Guadeloupe late on August 23 and entered the Caribbean Sea shortly thereafter. Although satellite intensity estimates indicated tropical storm status, 13 reconnaissance flights conducted by the National Hurricane Center between August 23 and August 27 indicated winds were less than 40 mph (64 km/h). By August 25, the depression made landfall near Santo Domingo, Dominican Republic. Despite the mountainous terrain of Hispaniola, the depression did not weaken and re-emerged into the Atlantic from the northern coast of Haiti early on August 26. The depression curved northwestward and did not strengthen. On August 27, the depression made another landfall near Andros Town on Andros, Bahamas. Later that day, the depression passed less than 25 miles (40 km) east of West Palm Beach, Florida. Thereafter, the depression curved north-northwestward and remained offshore of Florida.

At 0600 UTC on August 28, a ship located about 93 miles (150 km) from the center of the depression reported tropical storm force winds. As a result, the depression was finally upgraded to Tropical Storm Chris. Tracking rapidly north-northeastward, Chris attained its peak intensity about six hours later, with maximum sustained winds of 50 mph (80 km/h) and a minimum barometric pressure of 1,005 mbar (29.7 inHg). The storm made its final landfall near Savannah, Georgia with winds of 45 mph (72 km/h) at 1500 UTC on August 28. After moving inland, Chris quickly weakened and was downgraded to a tropical depression near Columbia, South Carolina on August 29. Shortly thereafter, Chris merged with a cold front over North Carolina. The remnants of Chris tracked east-northeastward across the Eastern United States. Eventually, the remnants briefly re-emerged into the Atlantic from New England, then moved across Nova Scotia before dissipating near Cape Breton Island on August 30.

== Preparations ==
In preparation of the tropical depression, officials in Puerto Rico closed public schools and sent federal workers home early. At 1000 UTC on August 28, a tropical storm watch was issued for Edisto Beach, South Carolina, to Cape Hatteras, North Carolina. Two hours later, areas from Savannah, Georgia, to Cape Hatteras North Carolina, were placed under a tropical storm warning. They were later discontinued at an unknown time. Residents of Charleston, South Carolina, complained of little warning in advance of the storm. However, as Chris moved ashore only nine hours after becoming a tropical storm, there was minimal time for preparations.

== Impact ==
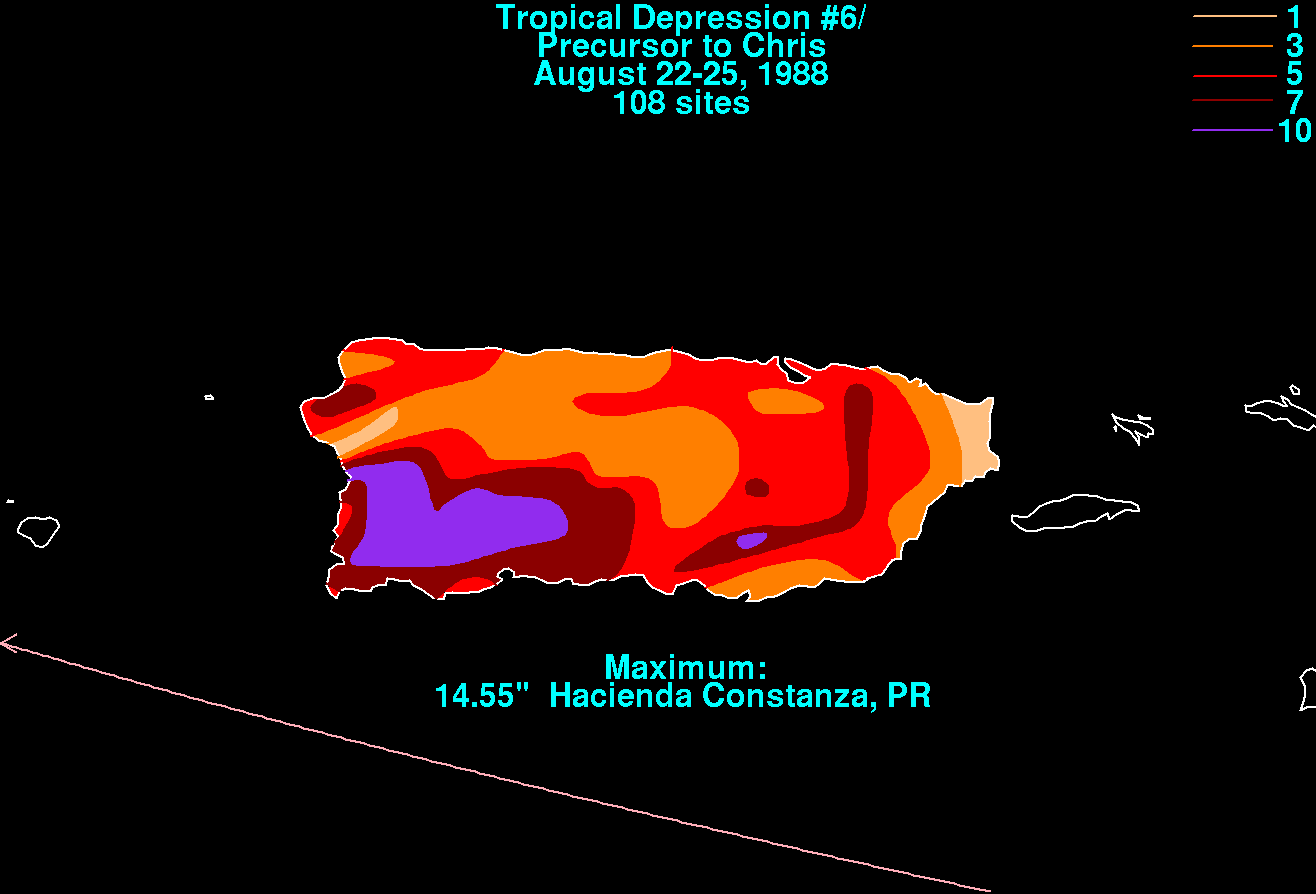
Rainfall totals in Puerto Rico.

=== Lesser and Greater Antilles ===
In the United States Virgin Islands, the depression dropped 1 inch (25 mm) of rain. Precipitation on the island of Puerto Rico was generally between 3 and 7 inches (76 and 178 mm), with a peak total of 14.5 inches (370 mm) in Hacienda Constanza. Heavy rainfall resulting in flooding, which damaged at least 100 homes and left 485 people homeless. By August 24, at least 15 people evacuated their homes because of flooding. Due to high winds, two cars were crushed by falling trees, causing the deaths of two men and one 12-year-old boy. Hispaniola received heavy rain and 35 mph (56 km/h) winds but no deaths or damage was reported. In the Bahamas, the storm brought winds of 35 mph (56 km/h) but left no damage.

=== United States ===
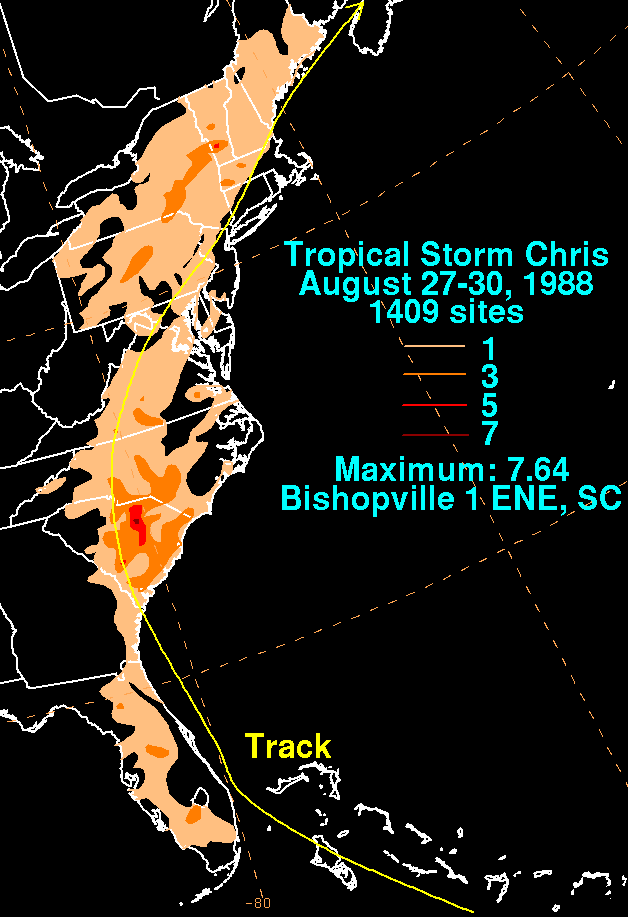
Rainfall totals from Tropical Storm Chris.

The outer bands of Chris produced 1–3 inches (25–76 mm) of rain in Florida, though no damage was reported. At Fort Pulaski National Monument in Georgia, tides were 1.5 feet (0.46 m) above normal. In that state, Chris produced a sustained wind speed of 43 mph (69 km/h) at Savannah Light, though it was at an elevation of 70 feet (21 m). In addition, the highest wind gust was reported at that location, reaching up to 49 mph (79 km/h). Elsewhere in Georgia, winds were light and were below tropical storm force. Rainfall in the state was mostly less than 2 inches (51 mm), with a peak of 2.01 inches (51 mm) in southeastern Georgia.

Along the coast of South Carolina, tides of at least 0.2 and 0.3 feet (0.061 and 0.091 m) above normal were reported at Charleston and Myrtle Beach, respectively. However, the Preliminary Report on Tropical Storm Chris indicates tides of 0.5 feet (0.15 m) at Charleston and 1 foot (0.30 m) above normal at Myrtle Beach. Several tornadoes were spawned in the state, one of which caused one fatality, one injury, and destroyed at least 15 mobile homes in Clarendon County. Overall, tornadoes in the state collectively resulted in more than $550,000 in damage (1988 USD). Debris littered U.S. Route 301, which briefly shutdown that highway. Winds were relatively light in the state, with sustained winds generally less than 30 mph (48 km/h) and gusts to 44 mph (71 km/h) were reported in Charleston. However, 18,000 people in Charleston and other nearby communities lost electricity. In addition, one mobile home was destroyed and another was overturned in Olanta. Rainfall in South Carolina was generally between 1 and 5 inches (25 and 127 mm), though peaking at 7.64 inches (194 mm) in Bishopville. Near Columbia, 1.72 inches (44 mm) of rain fell in only an hour, leaving standing water on several roads, including Interstate 26.

In North Carolina, a tornado spawned in Iredell County threw a tractor-trailer into a building at an industrial park. The tornado also struck the Iredell Container Corp. building and damaged several nearby mobile homes. As a result, numerous residents of Iredell County were left without gas or electricity. Four houses and a produce stand were destroyed by another tornado along U.S. Route 401 in Cumberland County. A third tornado in Granville County caused one injury and light damage. Collectively, the three tornadoes in the state caused at least $1 million (1988 USD) in damage. In Charlotte, a wind gust of 42 mph (68 km/h) was reported, which downed power lines and damaged the facade of a hotel.

In Mecklenburg County, Virginia, an F2 tornado spawned near Chase City damaged or destroyed ten buildings, including a mobile home, which was wrapped completely around a tree. Additionally, several vehicles were damaged and one injury occurred. Damage from that tornado reached about $700,000 (1988 USD). Winds in Washington D.C. reached slightly more than 47 mph (76 km/h), leaving 3,800 homes without electricity. In Maryland, rainfall was less than 2 inches (51 mm) at all locations. A wind gust reaching 55 mph (89 km/h) was reported in Baltimore, though sustained winds were below tropical storm force. Similar amounts of rainfall occurred in other nearby states such as Delaware, New Jersey, and Pennsylvania; minor creek flooding occurred in those three states. In Wilmington, Delaware, a wind gust of 48 mph (77 km/h) was reported. Power lines were snapped in Essex County, New Jersey.

The storm downed power lines on Staten Island and Long Island in New York, leaving 31,000 people without power. However, many had their electricity restored within 24 hours. A woman was killed in Mamaroneck when an oak tree fell on her car. According to New York City Transit officials, trees also fell on tracks, which slowed transportation services during rush hour. Two other fatalities when two people canoed in the Highland Falls Reservoir; high winds tipped their canoe and both people subsequently drowned. Wind gusts up to 40 mph (64 km/h) in Rhode Island caused scattered power outages and minor property damage, due to falling tree limbs. In Connecticut, gusty winds felled trees, which struck power lines, leaving at least 59,000 people without electricity. High winds in Maine from the storm damaged power lines, leaving 10,000 people without electricity. The storm also damaged four houses and several automobiles near Crystal Lake. Throughout the United States, damaged totaled to at least $2.25 million (1988 USD).

=== Canada ===
The extratropical remnants of Chris dropped heavy rains and produced winds of 25–30 mph (40–48 km/h). There were no reports of damage.

== See also ==
- Other storms of the same name
- Hurricane Isaias - Took a very similar track in 2020.
- List of North Carolina hurricanes (1980–1999)
