= 2017 Pacific typhoon season =

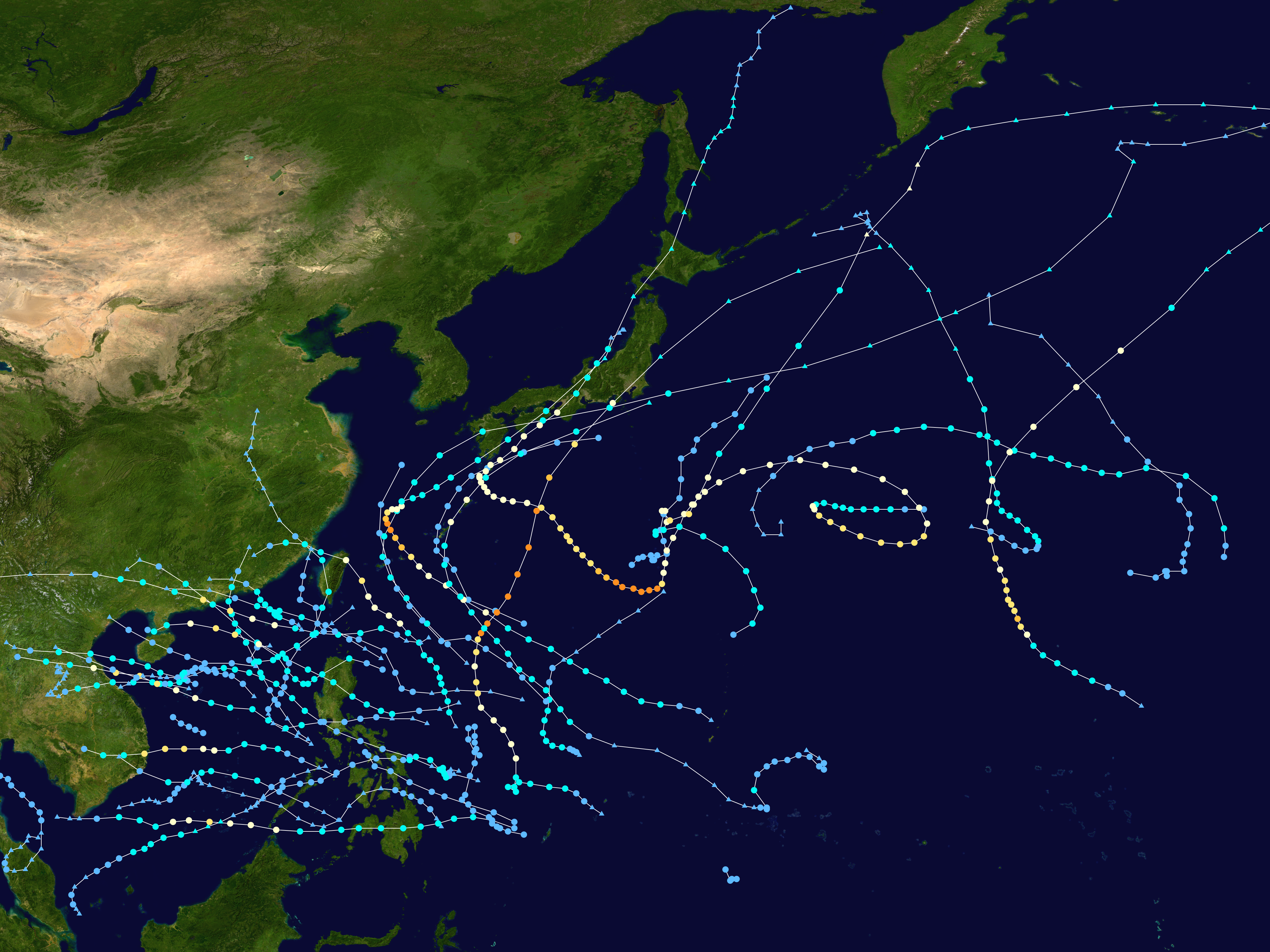
- Season summary map

Seasonal boundaries
- First system formed: January 7, 2017
- Last system dissipated: December 26, 2017

Strongest storm
- Name: Lan
  - Maximum winds: 185 km/h (115 mph) (10-minute sustained)
  - Lowest pressure: 915 hPa (mbar)

Seasonal statistics
- Total depressions: 41, 1 unofficial
- Total storms: 27
- Typhoons: 11
- Very strong typhoons: 3
- Violent typhoons: 0
- Total fatalities: 838 total
- Total damage: $15.1 billion (2017 USD)

Related articles
- Timeline of the 2017 Pacific typhoon season; 2017 Atlantic hurricane season; 2017 Pacific hurricane season; 2017 North Indian Ocean cyclone season

The 2017 Pacific typhoon season was a below-average season in terms of accumulated cyclone energy and the number of typhoons and super typhoons, and the first since the 1977 season to not produce a Category 5-equivalent typhoon on the Saffir–Simpson scale. The season produced a total of 27 named storms, 11 typhoons, and only two super typhoons, making it an slightly above-average season in terms of storm numbers. It was an event in the annual cycle of tropical cyclone formation, in which tropical cyclones form in the western Pacific Ocean. The season runs throughout 2017, though most tropical cyclones typically develop between June and November. The season's first named storm, Muifa, developed on April 25, while the season's last named storm, Tembin, dissipated on December 26. This season also featured the latest occurrence of the first typhoon of the year since 1998, with Noru reaching this intensity on July 23.

The scope of this article is limited to the Pacific Ocean, to the north of the equator between 100°E and the 180th meridian. Within the northwestern Pacific Ocean, there are two separate agencies that assign names to tropical cyclones, which can often result in a cyclone having two names. The Japan Meteorological Agency (JMA) will name a tropical cyclone should it be judged to have 10-minute sustained wind speeds of at least 65 km/h (40 mph) anywhere in the basin. PAGASA assigns unofficial names to tropical cyclones which move into or form as a tropical depression in their area of responsibility, located between 115°E–135°E and between 5°N–25°N, regardless of whether or not a tropical cyclone has already been given a name by the JMA. Tropical depressions that are monitored by the United States' Joint Typhoon Warning Center (JTWC) are given a numerical designation with a "W" suffix.

== Seasonal forecast ==
TSR forecasts Date	Tropical storms	Total Typhoons	Intense TCs	ACE	Ref
Average (1965–2016)	26	16	9	297	
May 5, 2017	27	17	10	357	
July 6, 2017	25	15	7	250	
August 8, 2017	26	14	7	255	
Other forecasts Date	Forecast Center	Period		Systems	Ref
January 20, 2017	PAGASA	January — March		1–2 tropical cyclones	
January 20, 2017	PAGASA	April — June		2–5 tropical cyclones	
June 26, 2017	CWB	January 1 — December 31		21–25 tropical storms	
July 6, 2017	PAGASA	July — September		6–9 tropical cyclones	
July 6, 2017	PAGASA	October — December		2–5 tropical cyclones	
2017 season	Forecast Center	Tropical cyclones	Tropical storms	Typhoons	Ref
Actual activity:	JMA	41	27	11	
Actual activity:	JTWC	33	26	13	
Actual activity:	PAGASA	22	16	4	

During the year, several national meteorological services and scientific agencies forecast how many tropical cyclones, tropical storms, and typhoons will form during a season and/or how many tropical cyclones will affect a particular country. These agencies include the Tropical Storm Risk (TSR) Consortium of University College London, PAGASA, and Taiwan's Central Weather Bureau. The first forecast of the year was released by PAGASA during January 20, within its seasonal climate outlook for the period January–June. The outlook noted that one to two tropical cyclones were expected between January and March, while two to four were expected to develop or enter the Philippine Area of Responsibility between April and June. On March 23, the Hong Kong Observatory predicted that the tropical cyclone season in Hong Kong would be near-normal, with four to seven tropical cyclones coming within 500 km (310 mi) of the territory, compared to an average of six, which was revised to six to nine tropical cyclones in August.

On May 5, Tropical Storm Risk (TSR) issued their first forecast for the season, anticipating an activity of slightly above normal with 27 named storms, 17 typhoons and 10 intense typhoons, including an accumulated cyclone energy (ACE) of 357. On June 26, Taiwan's Central Weather Bureau (CWB) predicted a normal season with 21–25 tropical storms developing over the basin, while three — five systems were expected to affect Taiwan itself. On the same day, the Thai Meteorological Department (TMD) predicted that 2 tropical cyclones would move towards the northern or northeastern parts of Thailand during August or September. On July 6, TSR released their second forecast for the season, reducing the predicted numbers to 25 named storms, 15 typhoons, and 7 intense typhoons, with an ACE Index of 250. During the same day, the PAGASA issued their second and final outlook for the season for the period of July–December, where six to nine tropical cyclones were expected to develop or entered their area of responsibility between July and September, while three to five were forecast during October to December. During August 8, the TSR released their third and final forecast for the season, slightly raising their forecast named storms to 26, with 14 reaching typhoon intensity and 7 reaching intense typhoon intensity. ACE Indices were slightly raised to 255.

== Season summary ==
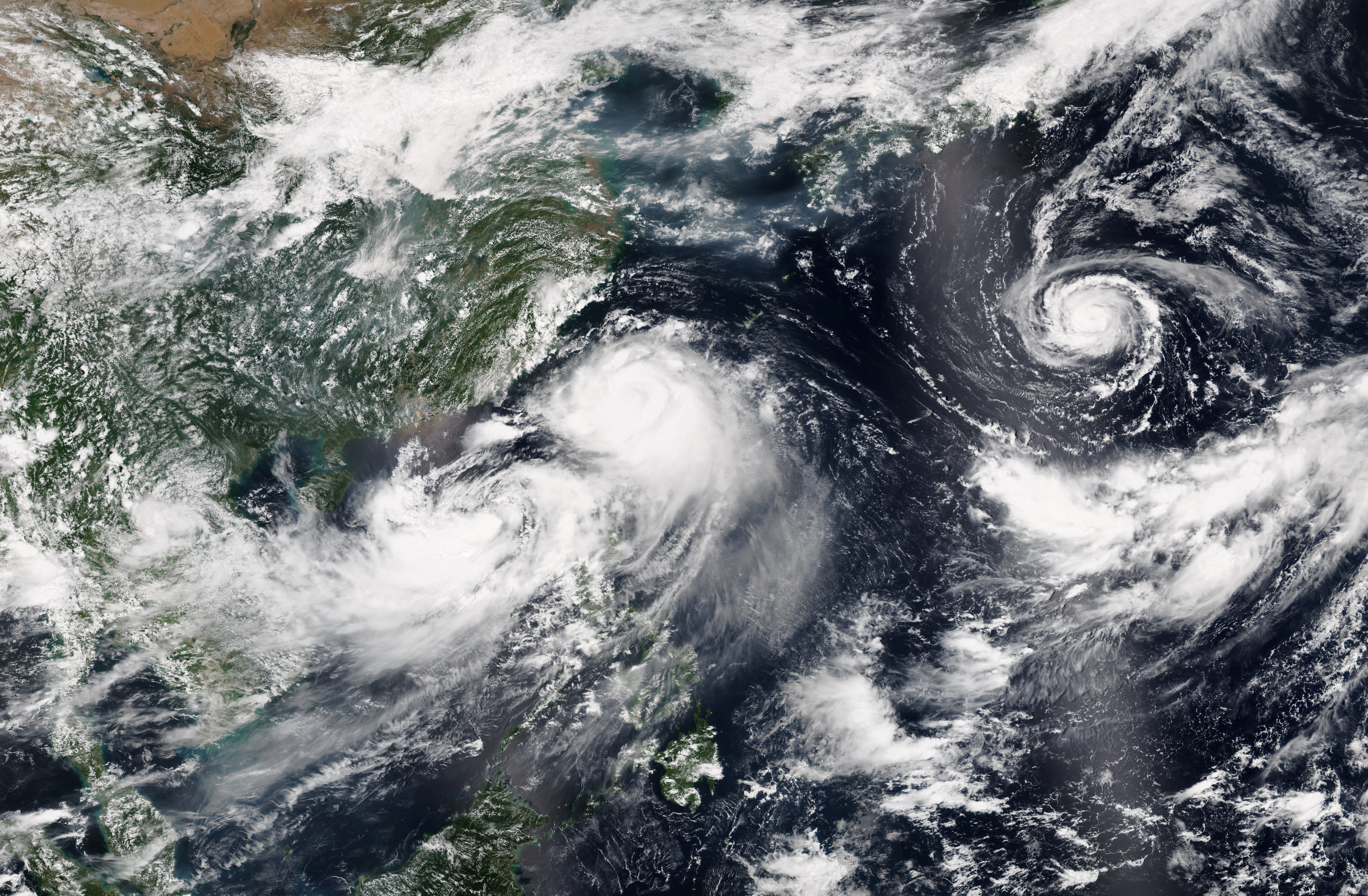
On July 29, four storms were active simultaneously: the remnants of Sonca (the furthest left and inland), Haitang (center-left), Nesat (center-right), and Noru (top-right).

The first half of the season was relatively inactive, with only seven systems developing, of which only two intensified into tropical storms. The first tropical depression developed on January 7 and was named Auring by PAGASA. Another depression, Bising, developed during the first week of February, and was a factor in, and worsened the effects of, the 2017 Visayas and Mindanao floods. This was followed by Crising, the third system to have received a local name from PAGASA. Heavy rains from the depression caused flooding that killed ten people in Cebu, Philippines. Shortly after Crising dissipated, the first tropical storm of the season, Muifa, formed. Since it was not strong and located away from all major land areas, it caused no damage. No systems formed during the month of May, the first such occurrence since 2013. The next named storm, Merbok, formed during mid-June, and made landfall in Shenzhen in China. The cyclone was short-lived; however, it was relatively strong, producing winds of 100 km/h (60 mph) at its peak. Nanmadol passed over the Ryukyu Islands and progressed to make landfall in Nagasaki on Japan's island of Kyushu during early July. Torrential rainfall and strong winds from the cyclone itself and from the stormy weather that persisted for a number of days were responsible for major damage and 41 fatalities across mainland Japan.

By the middle of July, tropical activity had increased with simultaneous tropical storms developing after July 14. Severe Tropical Storm Talas formed during mid-July near the Paracel Islands in the South China Sea, and traveled generally westwards. It made landfall in Vietnam after brushing China's Hainan province and, unusually, continued to track far inland to the Laos–Thailand border before weakening to a depression. At least 14 deaths were attributed to the storm, primarily as a result of flooding. Later, the season was very active with 7 storms in late July-early August. Typhoon Noru reached Category 4 super typhoon in peak intensity and made landfall in Japan, causing $100 million in damage. Tropical Storm Sonca made landfall in Quảng Trị, Vietnam; 2017 was the first year since 1971 where 2 storms made landfall in Central Vietnam in July. Sonca brought heavy rainfall in Northeast Thailand and caused extreme flooding in the region with estimated costs of over US$300 million. Typhoon Nesat and Tropical Storm Haitang made landfall in Taiwan and Fujian (a province in China), respectively, 2 days apart. In mid-late August, Typhoon Hato and Tropical Storm Pakhar made landfall in Macau and Guangdong respectively while they were at peak intensity. Typhoon Hato was the costliest tropical cyclone in Northwest Pacific in 2017 with damages totalling $6.82 billion.

The season was weaker in September. Typhoon Talim made landfall in Japan as a minimal typhoon and caused US$700 million in damage. Typhoon Doksuri made landfall in Quảng Bình, Vietnam as a Category 3 typhoon; damage was very major as the total was estimated at over US$814 million. In early October a tropical depression made landfall in Northern and North Central Vietnam, which brought very heavy rainfall and was responsible for the worst flooding in Northern and North-Central Vietnam, with 109 deaths and total damages of over US$570 million. Later, Typhoon Khanun made landfall in Southern China. Typhoon Lan was the strongest tropical cyclone in the basin in 2017, going on to strike Japan, causing $2 billion in damages.

In November, La Niña returned and tropical activity had increased with simultaneous tropical storms developing, and most of them moved west and affected Philippines and Vietnam. Typhoon Damrey made landfall in Khánh Hòa, Vietnam and became one of the costliest typhoon in Vietnamese history since 1975; and it is one of the costliest and deadliest typhoon in the basin in 2017 with total damage reached US$1.03 billion and 151 deaths. Later, two weak storms affected Philippines. In December, Tropical storm Kai-tak caused flooding in Central Philippines. Typhoon Tembin was responsible for severe flooding and landslides in South Philippines, it became the deadliest tropical cyclone in 2017 with over 250 deaths.

== Systems ==
=== Tropical Depression 01W (Auring) ===
- Tropical depression (JMA)
- Tropical depression (SSHWS)
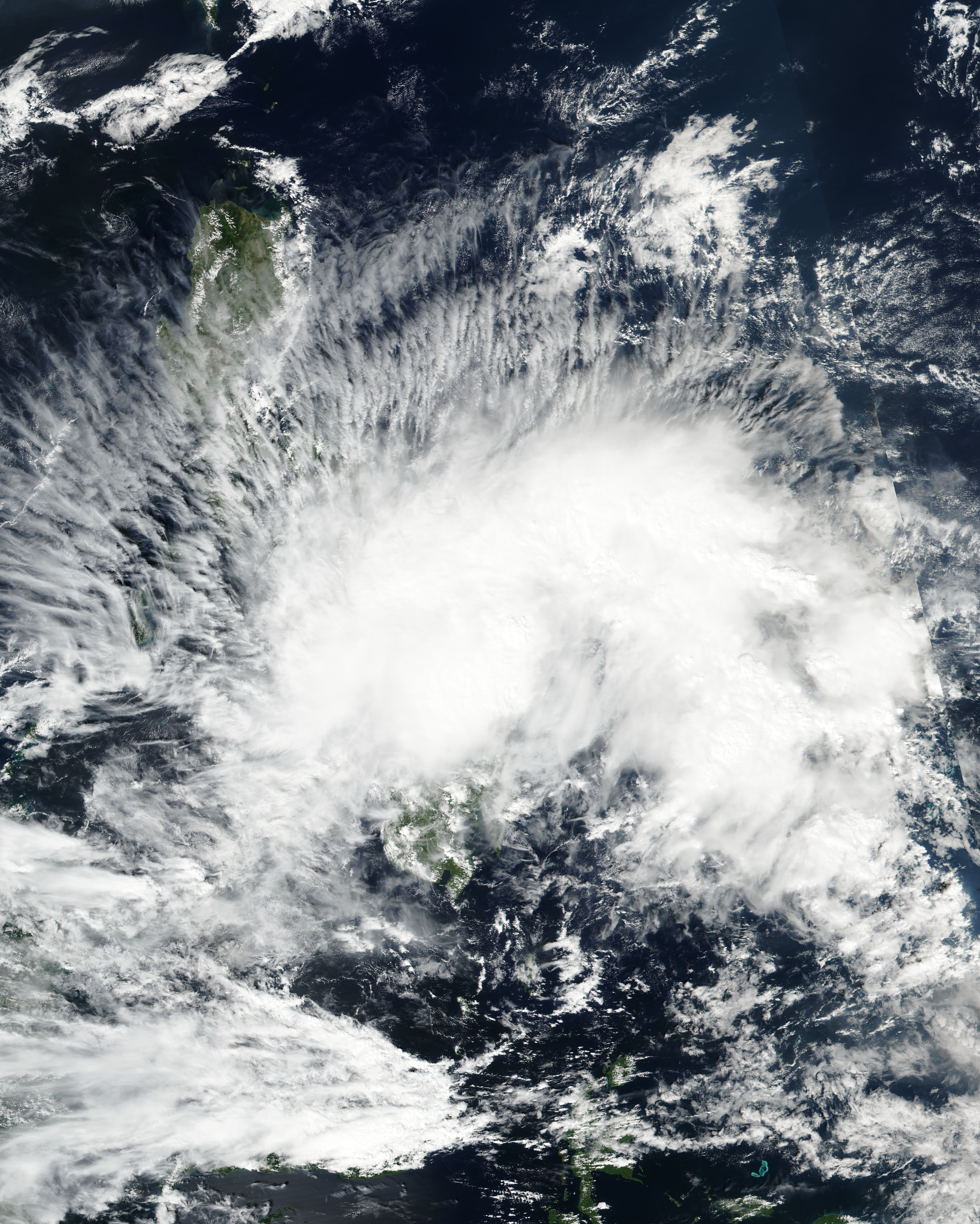
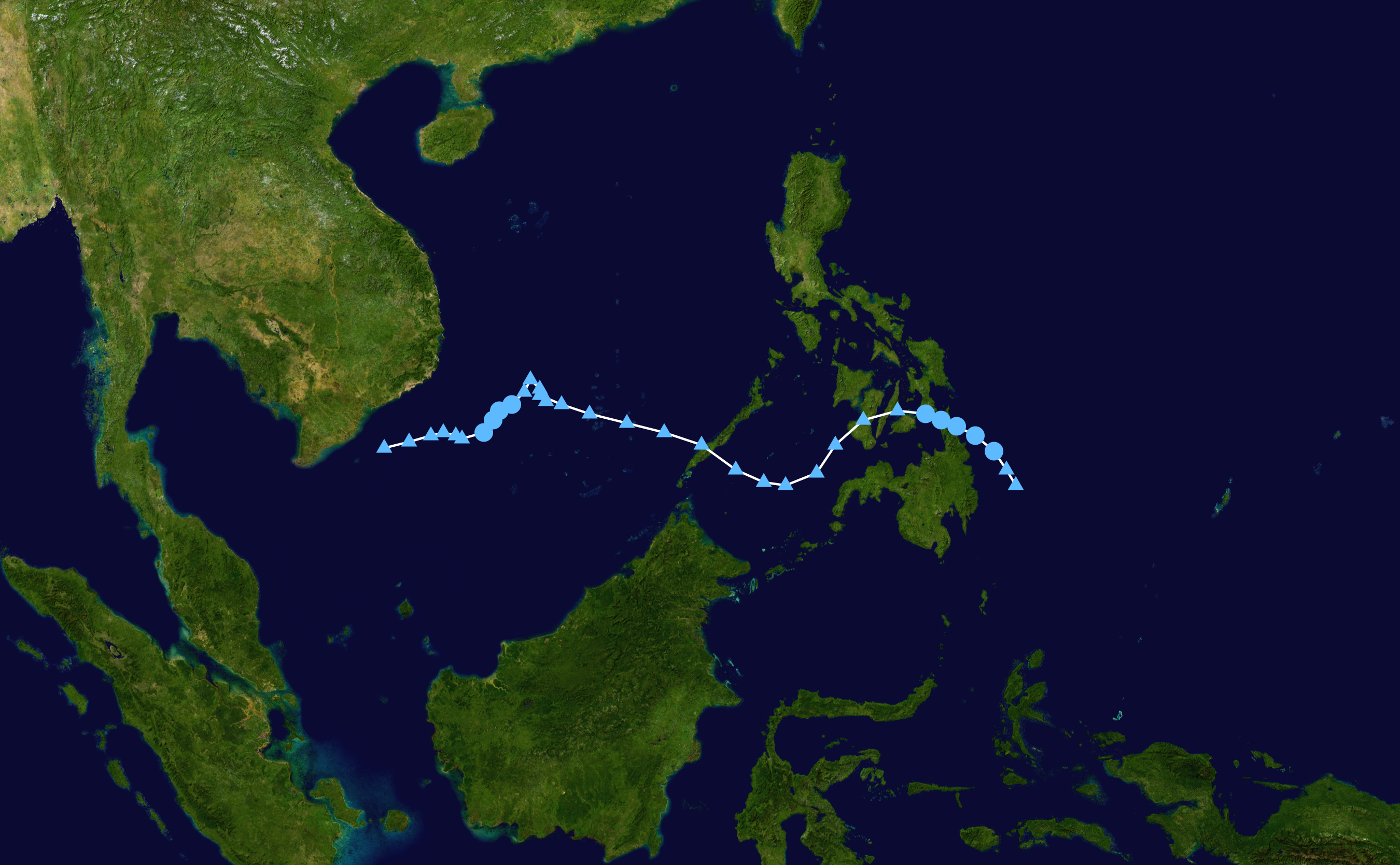
- Duration: January 7 – January 16
- Peak intensity: 55 km/h (35 mph) (10-min); 1000 hPa (mbar)

On January 7, both PAGASA and the JMA reported that Tropical Depression Auring developed about 400 km (250 mi) to the northeast of Davao City on Mindanao, Philippines. During that day, the system moved along the southern periphery of a subtropical ridge of high pressure, before the JTWC initiated advisories on the system and designated it as Tropical Depression 01W. It later made landfall in the Philippines the next day, and was assessed to have degenerated into a remnant low by the JTWC. The JMA tracked the system until it emerged into the South China Sea. By January 15, the JTWC re-issued advisories as it was located to the east of Vietnam. However, convection dissipated due to wind shear and land interaction, the JTWC issued their final warnings on January 16.

Flooding from Auring killed a total of 11 people. Damages from Tropical Depression Auring were totaled at ₱7.14 million (US$144,000) from agriculture and fishing in Negros Occidental.

=== Tropical Depression Bising ===
- Tropical depression (JMA)
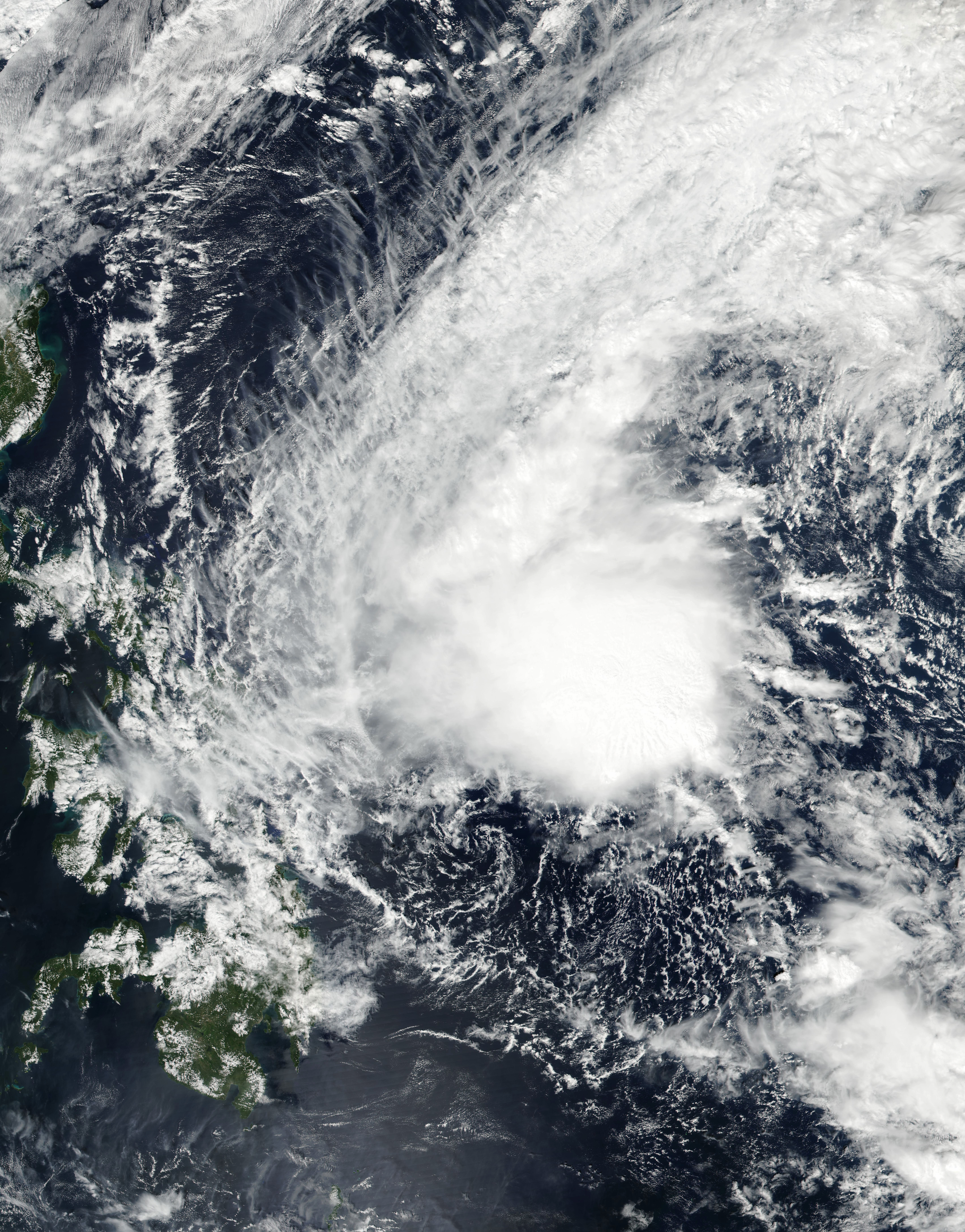
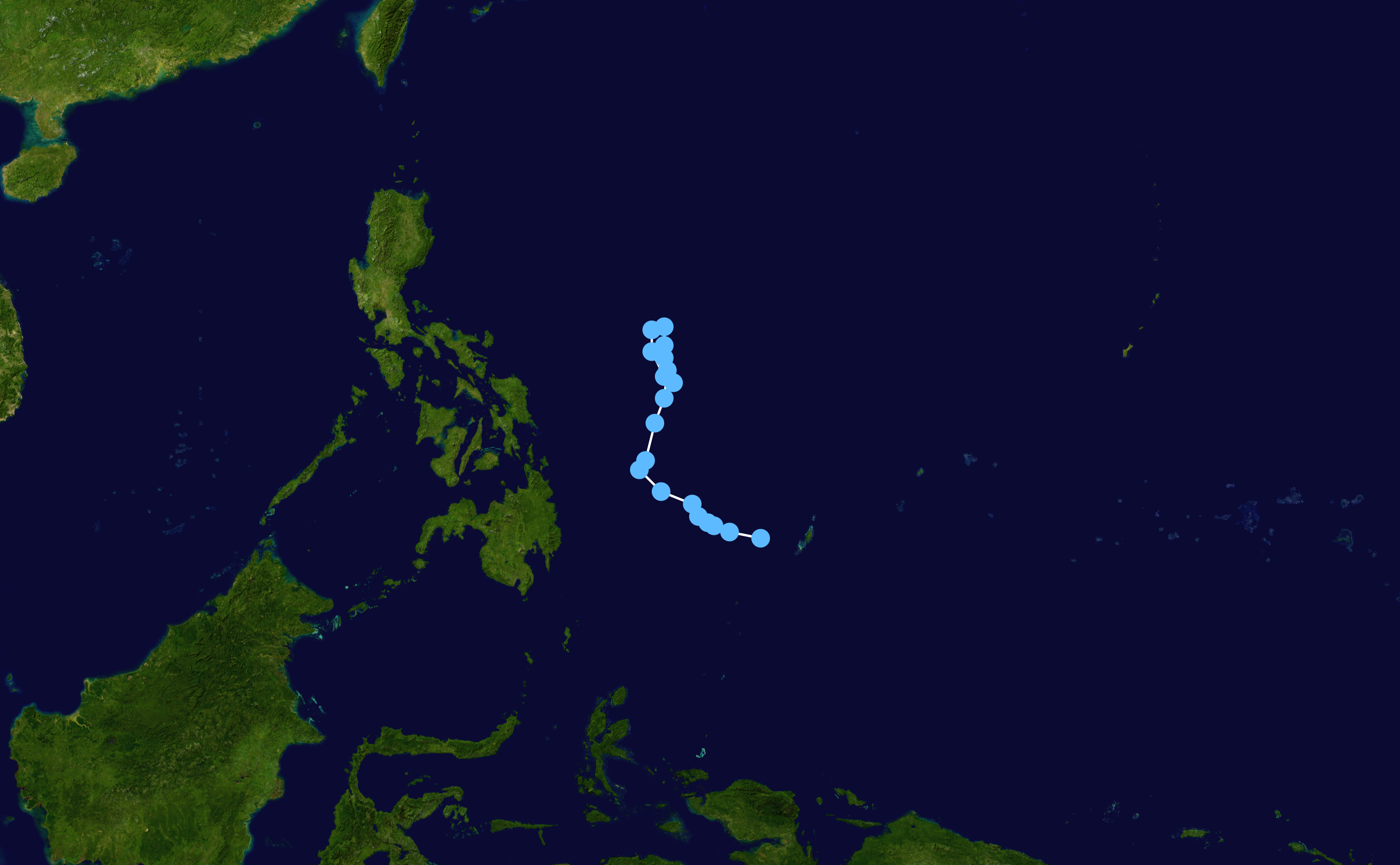
- Duration: February 3 – February 7
- Peak intensity: 55 km/h (35 mph) (10-min); 1000 hPa (mbar)

On February 3, a tropical depression developed near Palau. The PAGASA would later name it as "Bising" as the depression was present at the Philippine Area of Responsibility. The storm would meander around the Philippine Sea, until the depression started to weaken when its LLCC became exposed, while moving north-northeast. The agency would not notice its weakening until the next day, when they issued their last advisory.

=== Tropical Depression 02W (Crising) ===
- Tropical depression (JMA)
- Tropical depression (SSHWS)
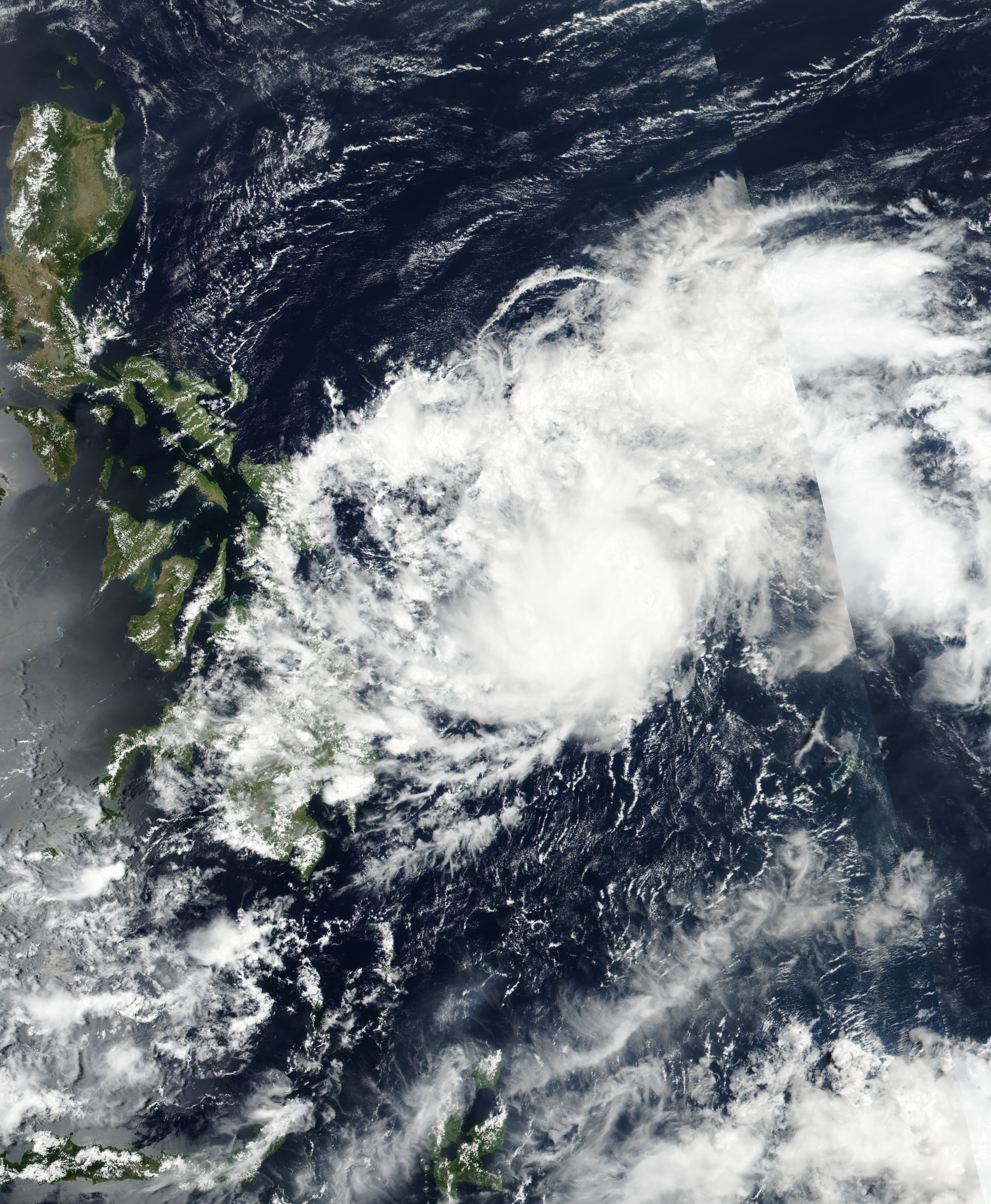
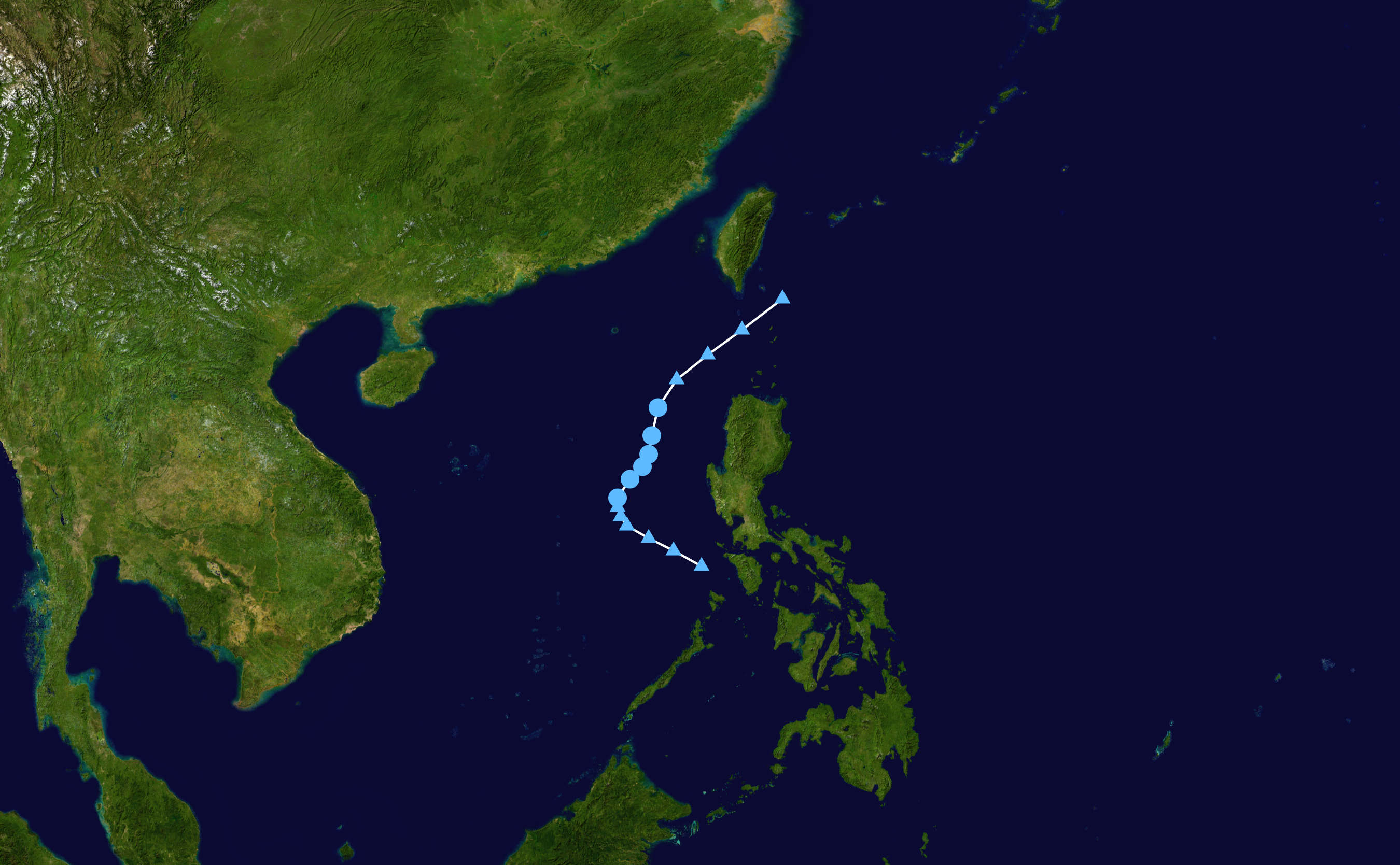
- Duration: April 13 – April 19
- Peak intensity: 55 km/h (35 mph) (10-min); 1006 hPa (mbar)

A tropical depression formed over Palau on April 13. On the next day, the JTWC designated the depression as "02W"; on the best track, the depression was a remnant low at this time. Hours later, the PAGASA would name it "Crising" as the depression was present at the Philippine Area of Responsibility. The depression would later shrink its size while approaching the Visayas region. On the following day, the agency reported that "Crising" slightly intensified while moving near the Samar provinces; the intensification of the storm would prove only momentarily and weakened again. The JTWC would later discontinue advisories on the storm; on its best track, the system remained as a disturbance. The PAGASA discontinued the advisories on the system as it was nearing landfall on 13:00 UTC (9:00 pm PHST) over Hernani, Eastern Samar. The remnants of the depression crossed the region and into the South China Sea. At 18:00 UTC on April 18, the JTWC would upgrade the disturbance as 02W; operationally, the system was kept as a disturbance. The status would be short-lived, as the JTWC declared 02W as a disturbance. The remnants would later linger around, dissipating on April 20, while in the Luzon Strait.

As of April 17, at least 10 people were reported to be killed in Cebu by flooding caused by the system. Total damages throughout the Philippines reached ₱84.8 million (US$1.7 million), mostly from Danao, Cebu.

=== Tropical Storm Muifa (Dante) ===
- Tropical storm (JMA)
- Tropical storm (SSHWS)
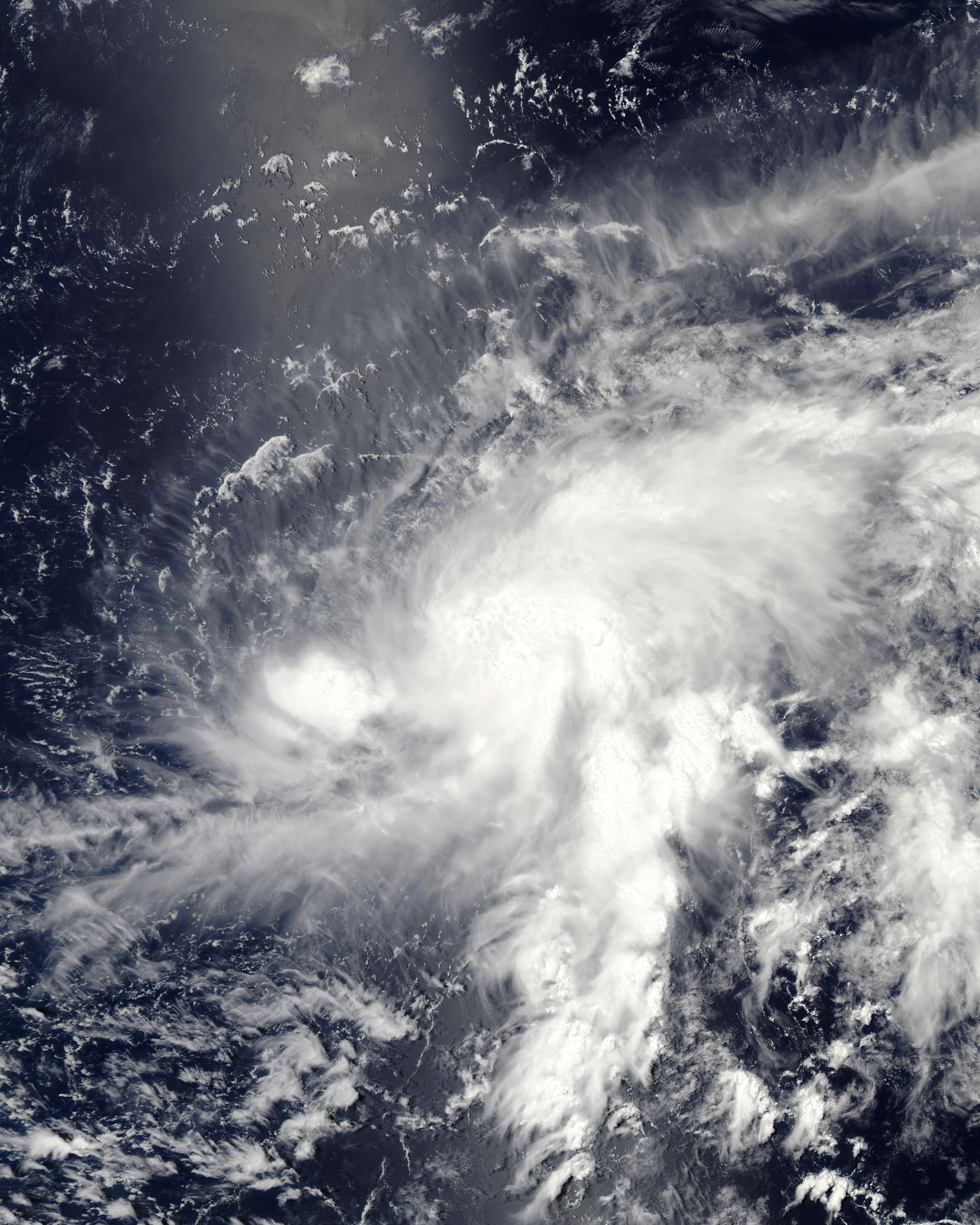
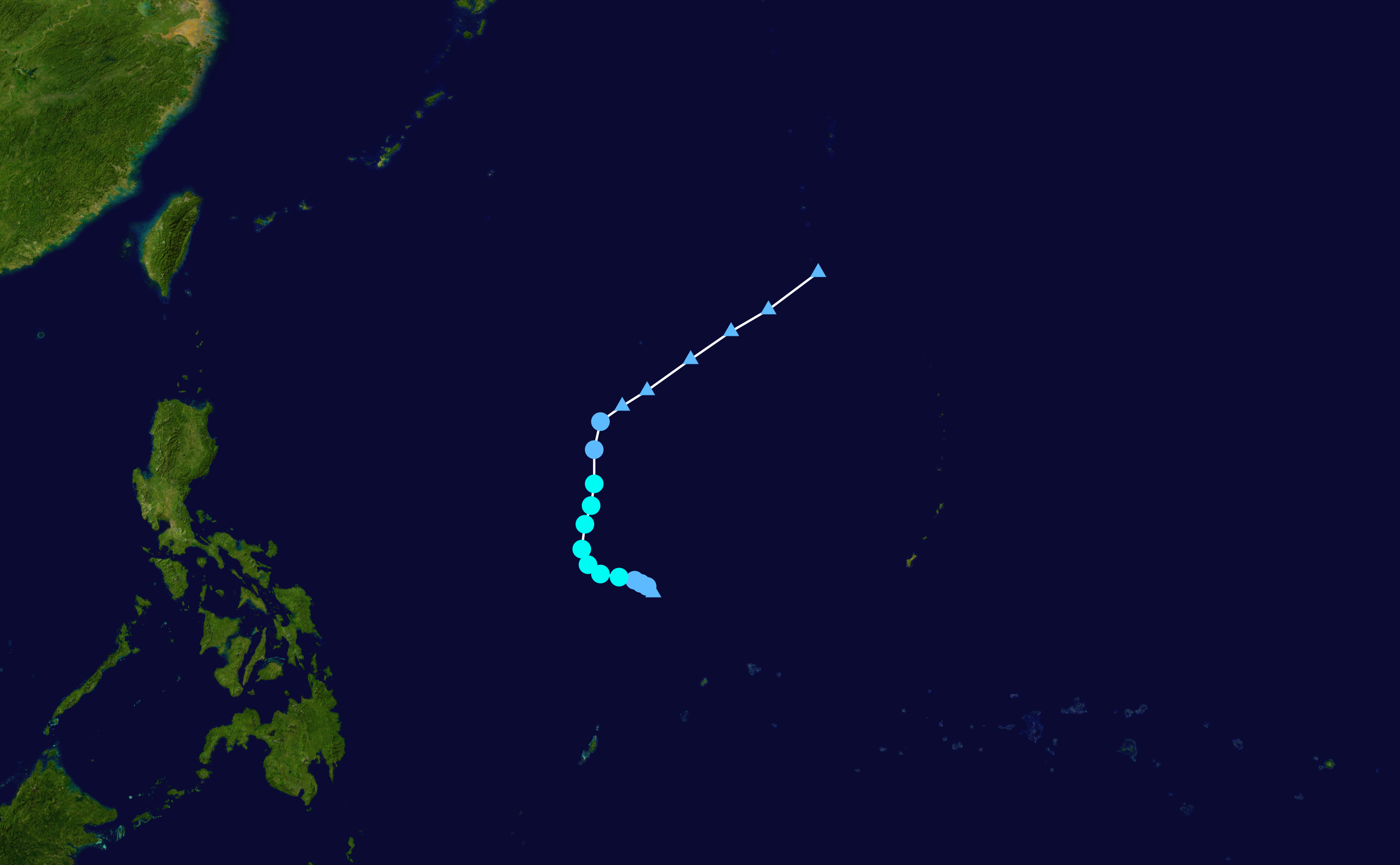
- Duration: April 22 – April 29
- Peak intensity: 65 km/h (40 mph) (10-min); 1002 hPa (mbar)

During April 22, the JMA started to monitor a tropical depression that had developed near Guam. After moving westward for a couple of days, the JTWC began issuing advisories, and designated the storm 03W. By April 25, 03W organized and began consolidating further as the JMA upgraded the depression to a tropical storm, giving it the name Muifa. Muifa entered the Philippine Area of Responsibility the following day, and was named Dante by PAGASA. The storm, however, started moving northwards and immediately tracked out of the area by April 27. Following this, both the JMA and the JTWC downgraded Muifa to a tropical depression. Muifa fully dissipated early on April 29, and the JMA issued their final advisory on the storm.

=== Severe Tropical Storm Merbok ===
- Severe tropical storm (JMA)
- Tropical storm (SSHWS)
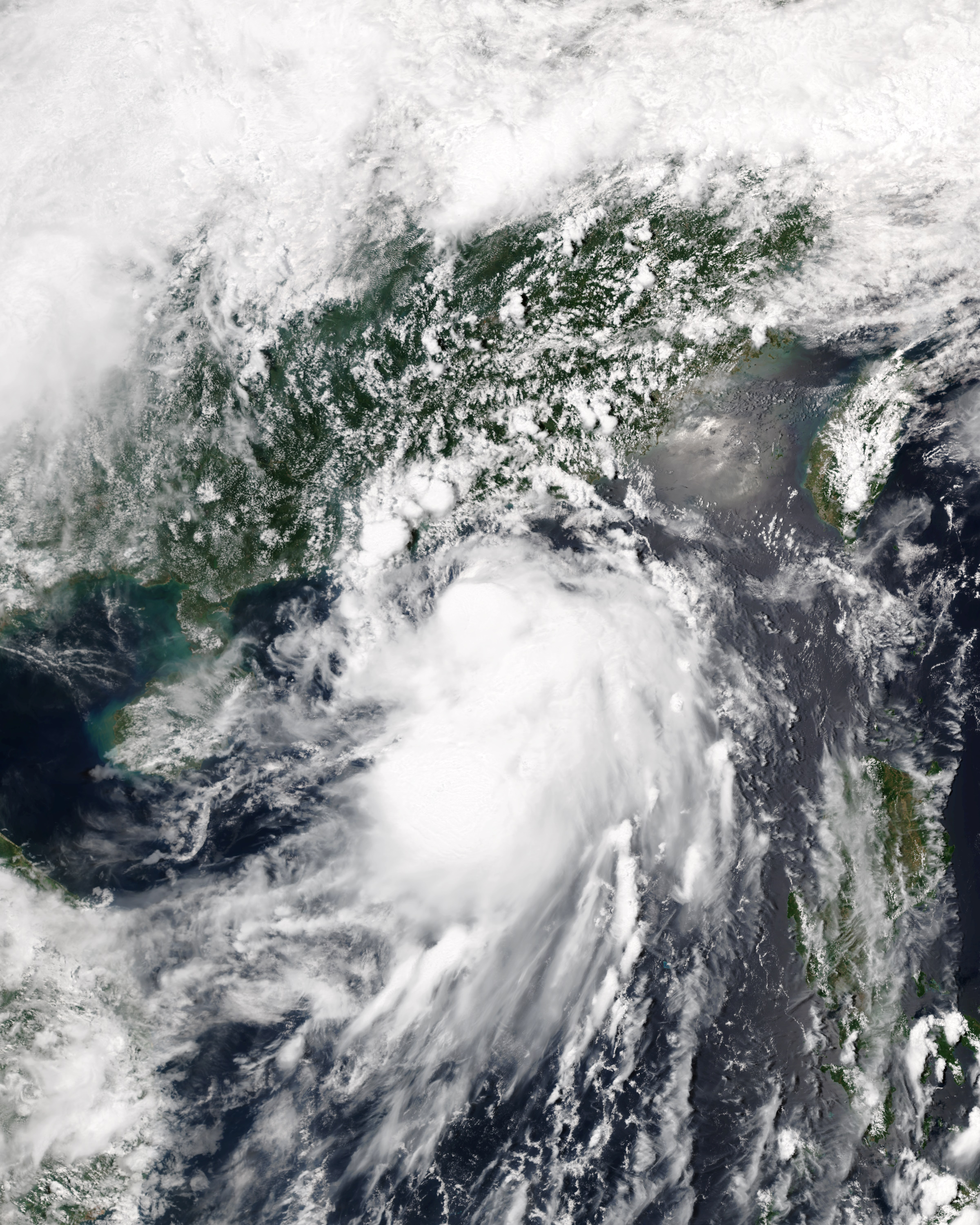
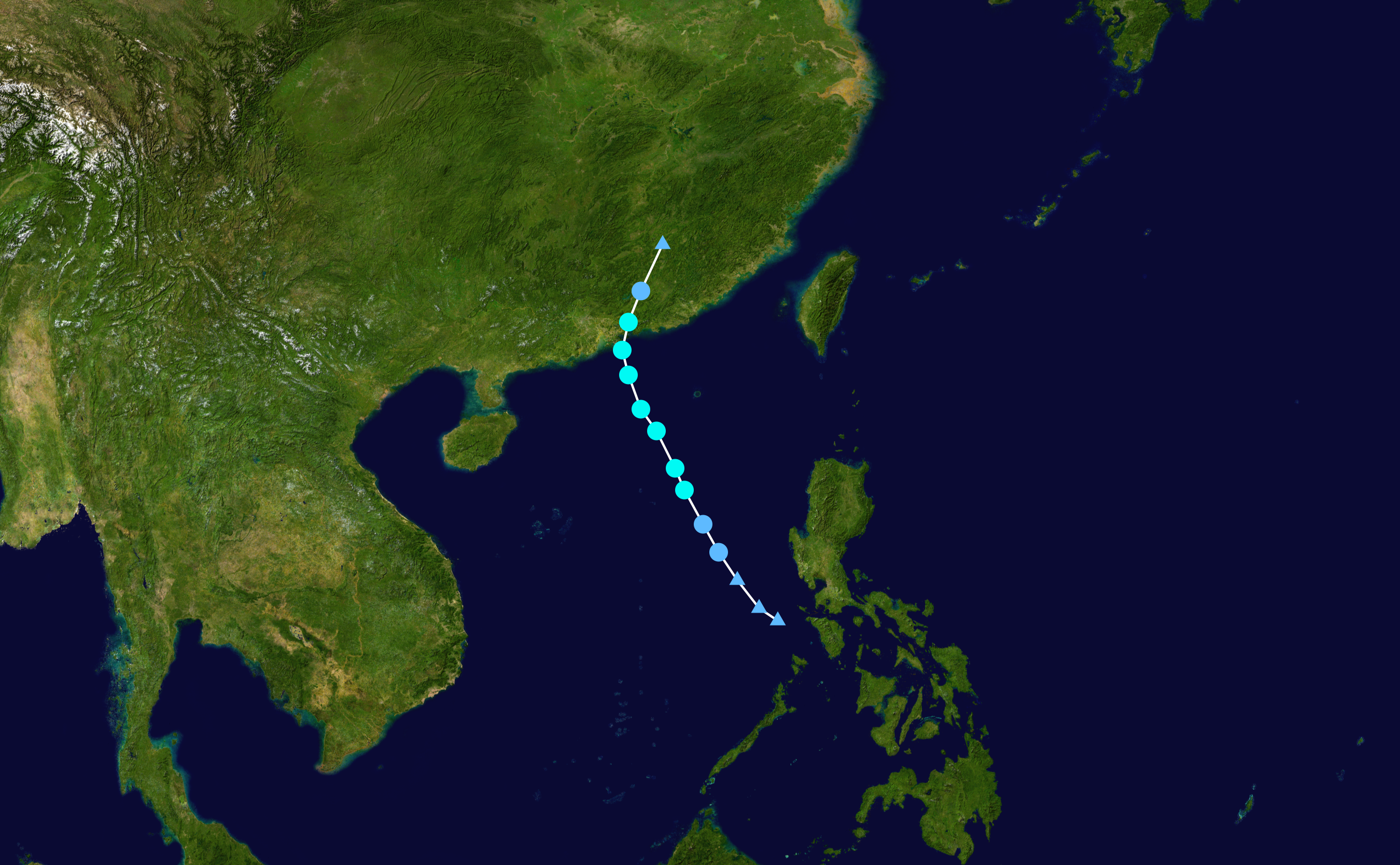
- Duration: June 10 – June 13
- Peak intensity: 100 km/h (65 mph) (10-min); 985 hPa (mbar)

On June 10, the JMA started to track a tropical depression to the west of Manila, Philippines. After the system entered a region favorable for further development, the depression rapidly organized, prompting the JTWC to start issuing advisories and give it the designation of 04W. A few hours later, 04W had intensified into a tropical storm, receiving the name Merbok as it starts to move in a north-northwestward direction. On June 12, Merbok reached its peak intensity with 10-minute winds of 100 km/h (60 mph) and a minimum pressure of 985 hPa, shortly before making landfall in Eastern Shenzhen. On June 13, the JMA issued its final warning on Merbok, as the system dissipated over China.

Sustained winds of 51.3 knots (95.0 km/h; 59.0 mph) and a minimum pressure of 990.3 hPa (29.24 inHg) were recorded in Hong Kong as the eye passed nearby. Across Guangdong Province, 32 homes were destroyed, 122,000 people reported property damage, and 13,000 hectares of crops flooded. Total economic losses in South China were counted to be CN¥600 million (US$88.3 million).

=== Severe Tropical Storm Nanmadol (Emong) ===
- Severe tropical storm (JMA)
- Category 1 typhoon (SSHWS)
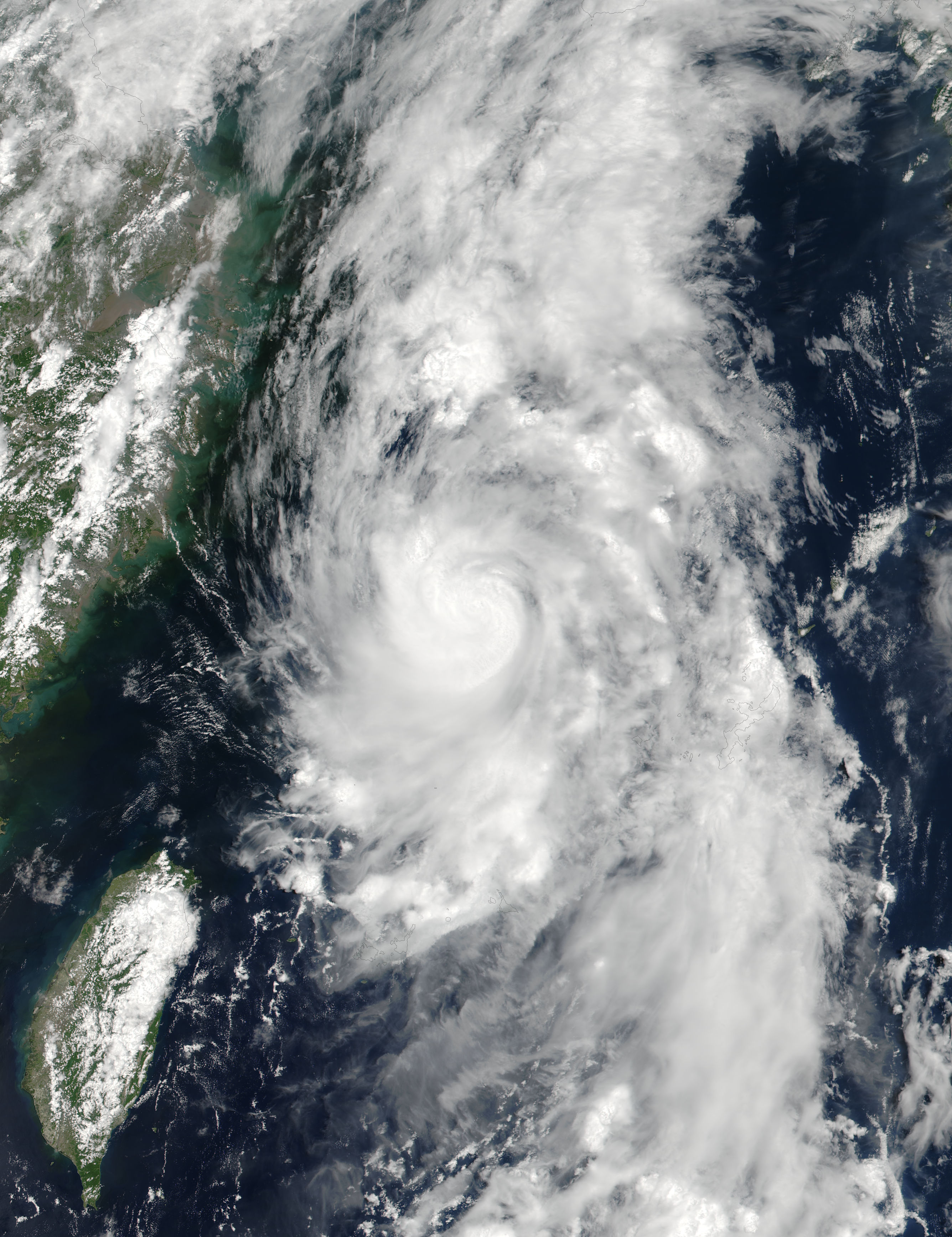
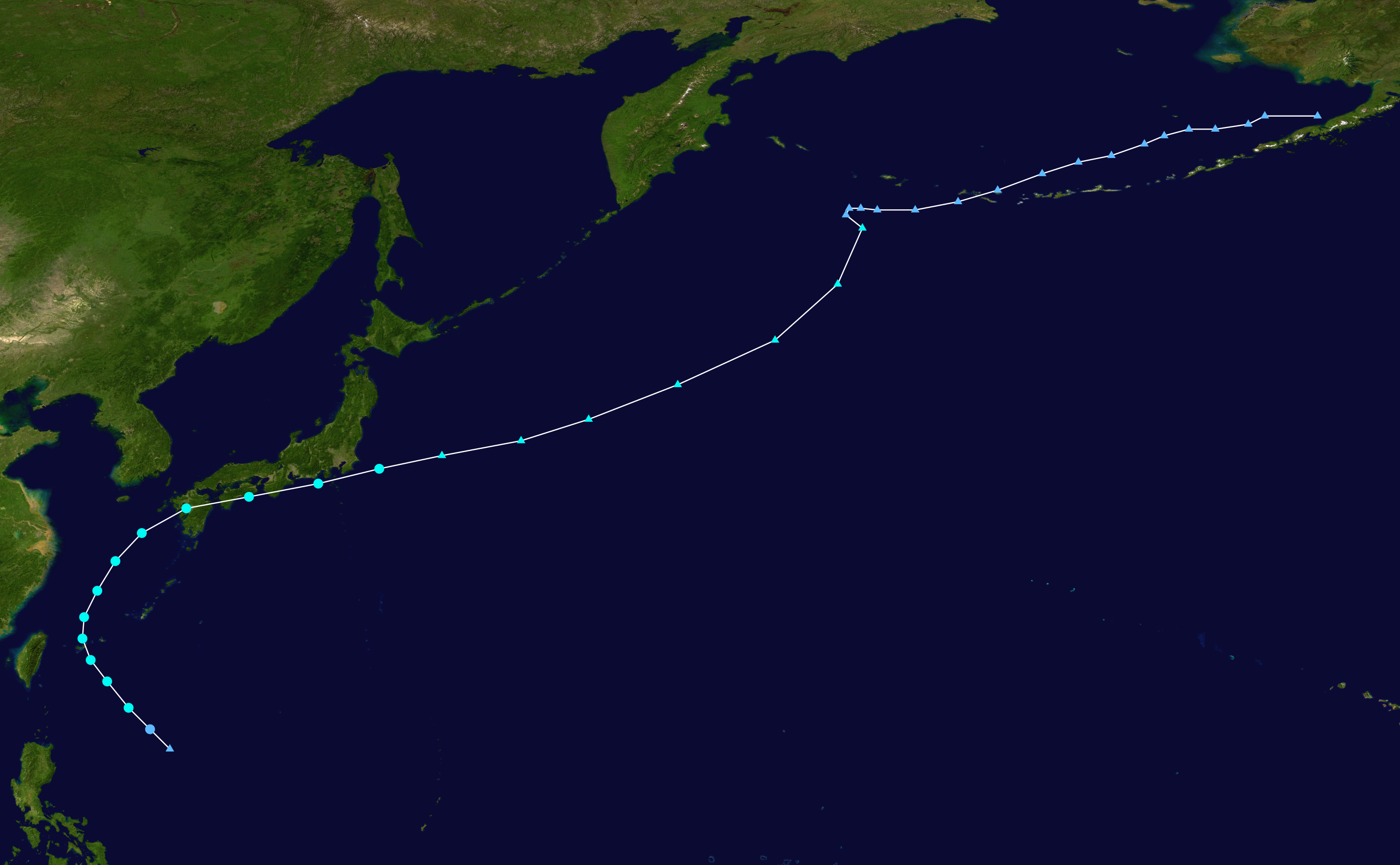
- Duration: July 1 – July 4
- Peak intensity: 100 km/h (65 mph) (10-min); 985 hPa (mbar)

On July 1, the JMA upgraded a low-pressure area it had been monitoring to a tropical depression, located south-southwest of Okinotorishima. Later that day, the JMA began issuing advisories once the depression's sustained winds were estimated at 55 km/h (35 mph). Shortly thereafter, the PAGASA classified the system as a tropical depression, assigning the local name Emong. On July 2, the JMA classified the system as a tropical storm, and assigned the official name Nanmadol. The JTWC followed suit and gave the internal designation of 05W. The cyclone continued to intensify, and was upgraded by the JMA to a severe tropical storm later that day. Nanmadol reached peak intensity at about 06:00 UTC on July 3, and maintained this strength until making landfall on the western coast of Kyushu several hours later. The cyclone began to accelerate while following a generally eastward course across the south of Japan. After brushing the southern coast of Japan, the JTWC issued its final advisory during the next day. The JMA followed suit late on July 4, when it had become extratropical. Its remnants moved out of the basin three days later.

Evacuation advisories were issued to at least 20,000 residents due to fears of possible flooding and landslides, especially in the prefectures of Niigata, Toyama and Nagano, which had experienced rainfall accumulations of up to 300 mm (12 in) in the preceding hours. At least three people were injured during the storm—a young boy's hand was injured when a school window broke in the city of Kumamoto, and two adults in Ōita prefecture sustained minor injuries after falling due to the strong winds. A total of 41 people have been confirmed dead due to torrential rains which caused landslides and flooding, particularly in Kyushu. Total damages from the storm in Japan were amounted to be ¥190 billion (US$1.68 billion).

=== Severe Tropical Storm Talas ===
- Severe tropical storm (JMA)
- Tropical storm (SSHWS)
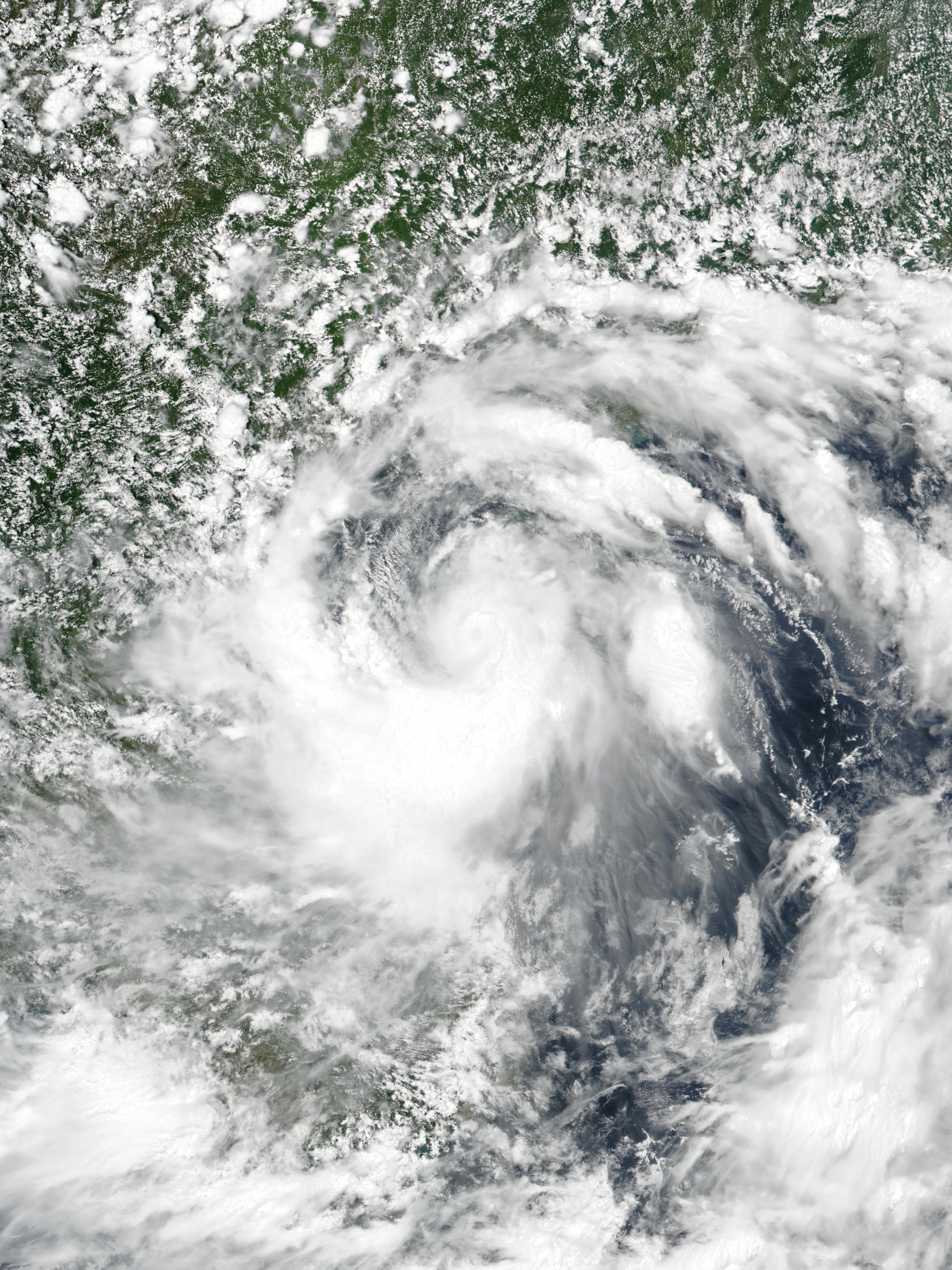
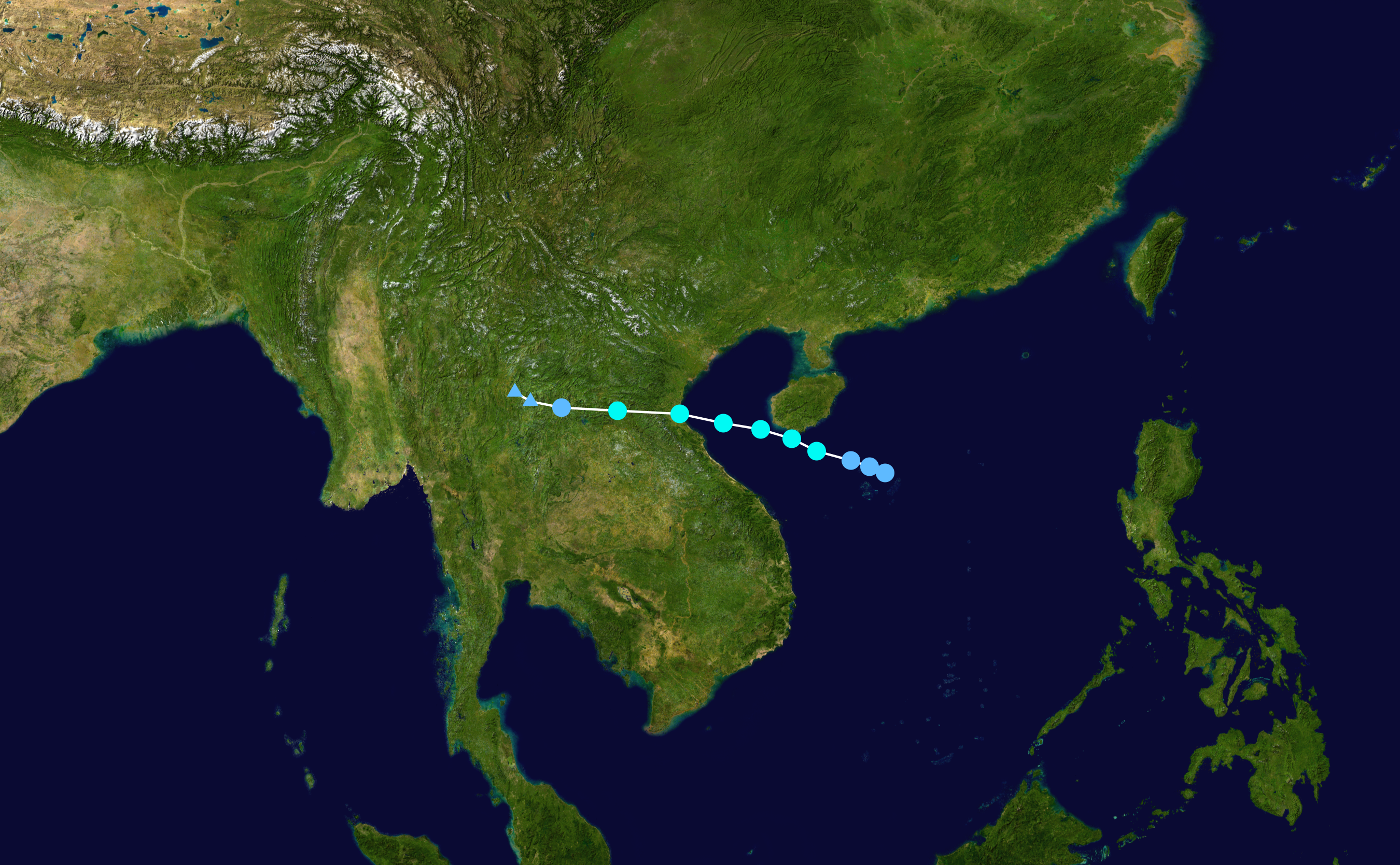
- Duration: July 14 – July 17
- Peak intensity: 95 km/h (60 mph) (10-min); 985 hPa (mbar)

Early on July 14, the JMA upgraded a low-pressure area in the South China Sea to a tropical depression after the system began to organize. Late the same day, the JMA began issuing advisories on the depression, and forecast it to develop into a tropical storm within the next 24 hours. The system intensified into a tropical storm, and was then named Talas. A few days later, Talas intensified further to become a severe tropical storm.

Talas made landfall near Vinh of Nghệ An Province in Central Vietnam at 01:00 ICT on July 17 (18:00 UTC on July 16) as a severe tropical storm. In Vietnam, the storm left 14 people dead and damaged around 2,700 houses. A coal ship with 13 crew members sank off the coast of Cửa Lò, leaving 3 dead and another 3 still unaccounted for. Damages in Vietnam were counted to be 993 billion₫ (US$43.7 million). Total economic losses in Hainan Province reached CNY 60 million (US$8.8 million).

=== Typhoon Noru ===
- Very strong typhoon (JMA)
- Category 4 super typhoon (SSHWS)
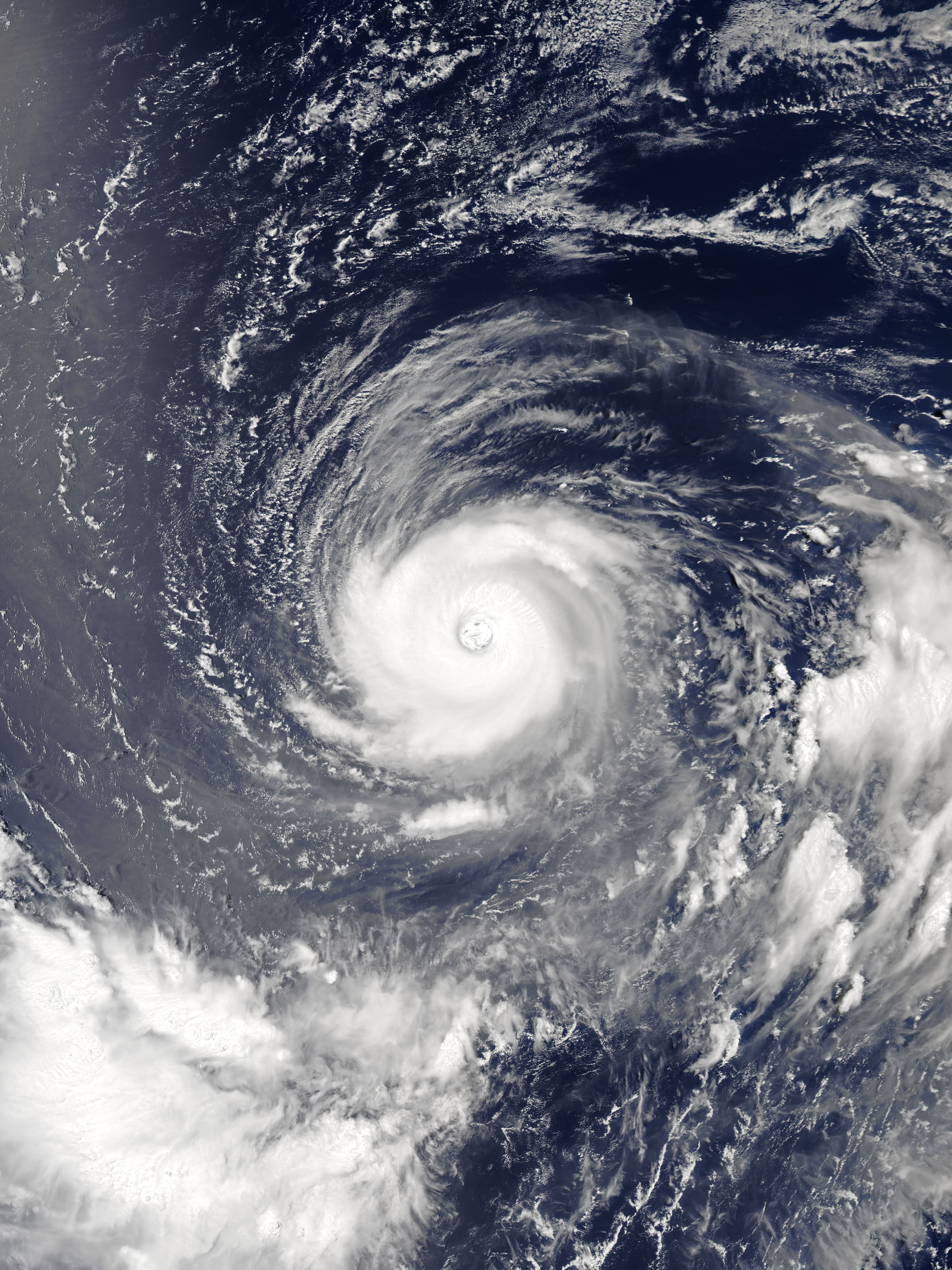
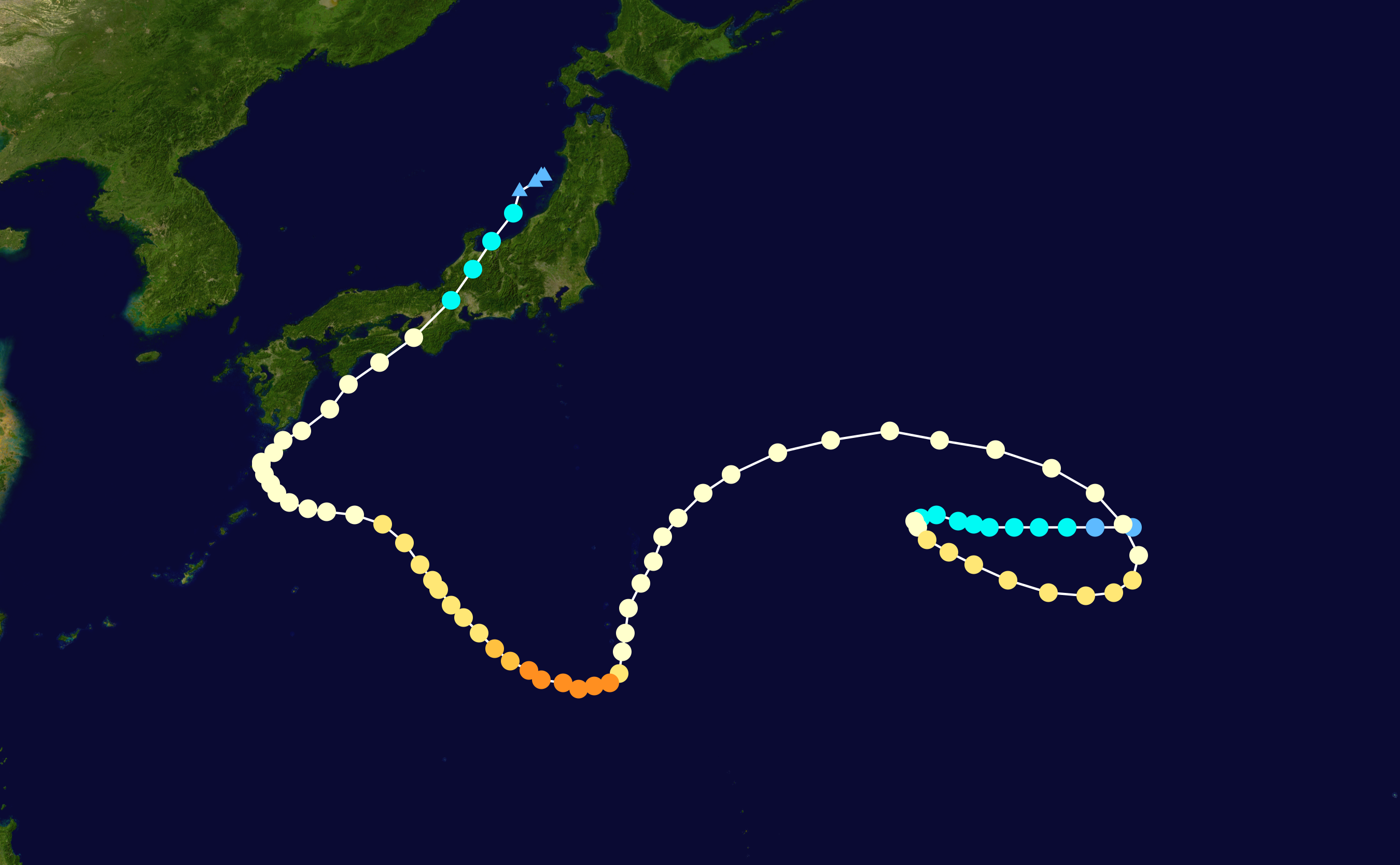
- Duration: July 19 – August 8
- Peak intensity: 175 km/h (110 mph) (10-min); 935 hPa (mbar)

The JMA reported that a non-tropical low had transitioned into a tropical depression north-northwest of Wake Island early on July 19. Twelve hours later it had strengthened to a tropical storm, and was named Noru. Noru then interacted with Tropical Storm Kulap, its counterpart storm, and began to exhibit a fujiwhara effect with Kulap. Tropical Storm Kulap then weakened enough, and when it dissipated, its remnants started to power Noru, and it became a severe tropical storm after, and continued its long and erratic journey towards Japan.

About halfway through July 22, the system became the first typhoon of the season, and fluctuations in intensity occurred until late on July 29, when it slowed down, and shortly thereafter, explosive intensification ensued, and Noru intensified into a Category 4 super typhoon. After it reached peak intensity, it quickly began to weaken for a short period of time before slowing the rate of weakening. It briefly accelerated, before yet again, it began to stall near Japan for some time before moving north and dissipating in the Sea of Japan. Total economic losses in Japan were counted to be US$100 million.

=== Tropical Storm Kulap ===
- Tropical storm (JMA)
- Tropical storm (SSHWS)
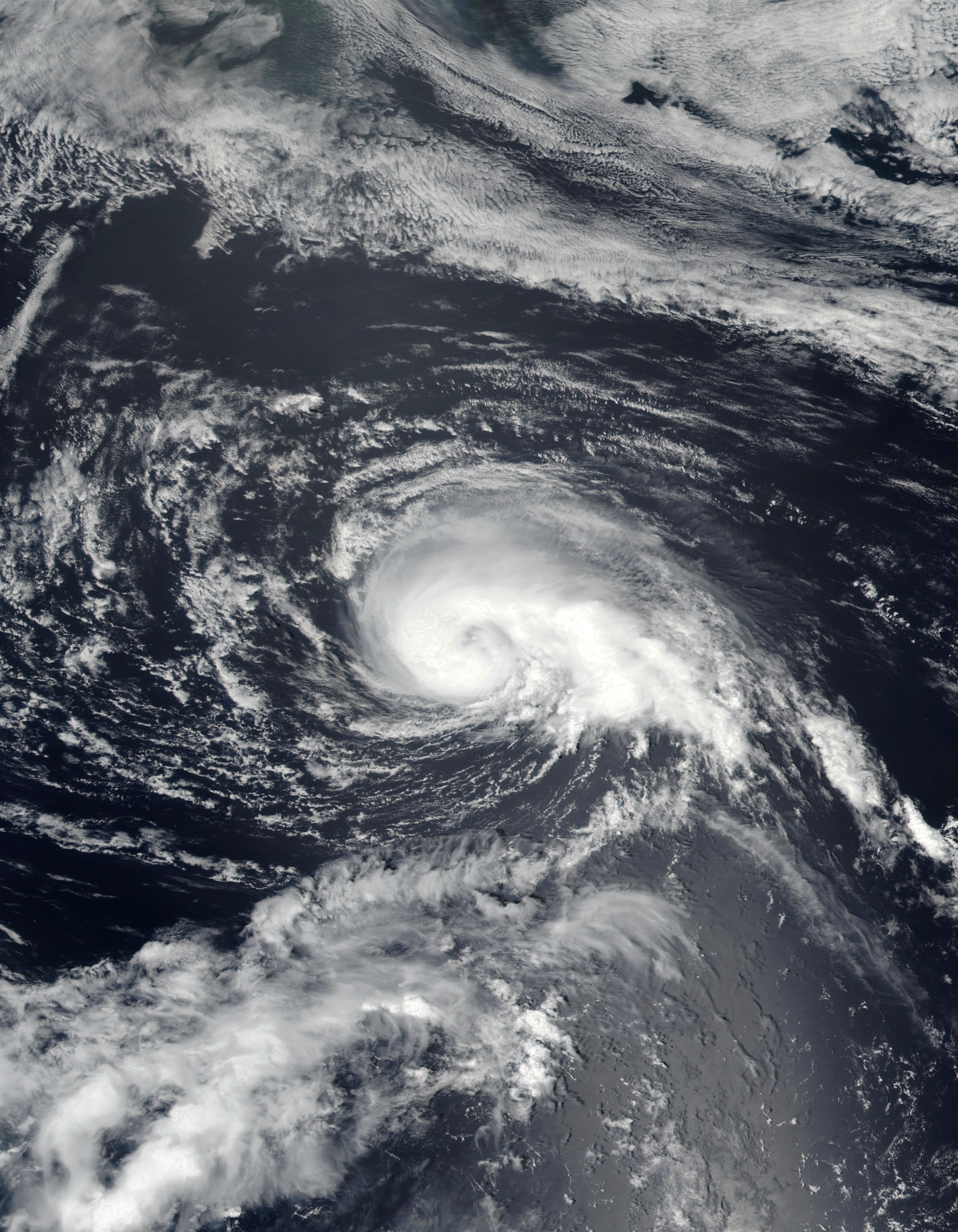
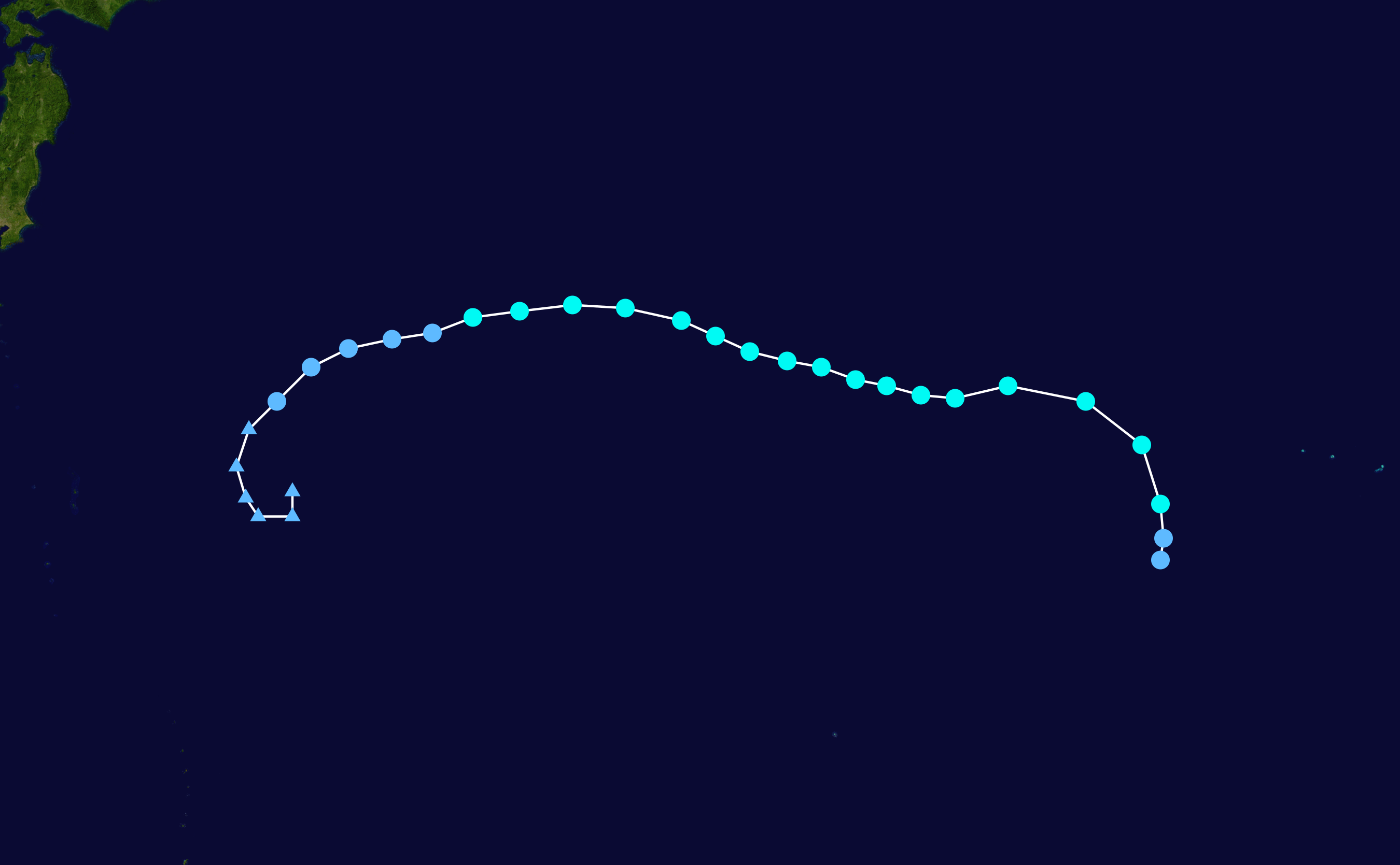
- Duration: July 20 – July 28
- Peak intensity: 75 km/h (45 mph) (10-min); 1002 hPa (mbar)

On July 20, the JMA started to monitor a tropical depression that formed over to the southwest of Midway Atoll, just to the west of the International Date Line. The JTWC classified the system as subtropical, however. By July 21, the subtropical storm started to show tropical characteristics, where it prompted both agencies to start issuing advisories, receiving the designation of 09W and the name Kulap. During the next day, Kulap briefly reached its peak intensity with 1-minute sustained winds of 95 km/h (60 mph) after imagery depicted some convection over near its compact center. After moving westward in a marginally favorable environment, the JMA had reported a minimum pressure of 1002 hPa with peak 10-minute winds of 75 km/h (45 mph) during the early hours of July 24. However several hours later, Kulap had entered in a very unfavorable environment such as cooler waters of 25 °C (77 °F). Due to strong shear and an interaction with Typhoon Noru to its south, Kulap had rapidly weakened; therefore, both agencies issued their final advisory on July 26. The JMA, however, tracked Kulap's remnants until July 28 when it was absorbed by the outflow of Typhoon Noru.

=== Tropical Storm Sonca ===
- Tropical storm (JMA)
- Tropical storm (SSHWS)
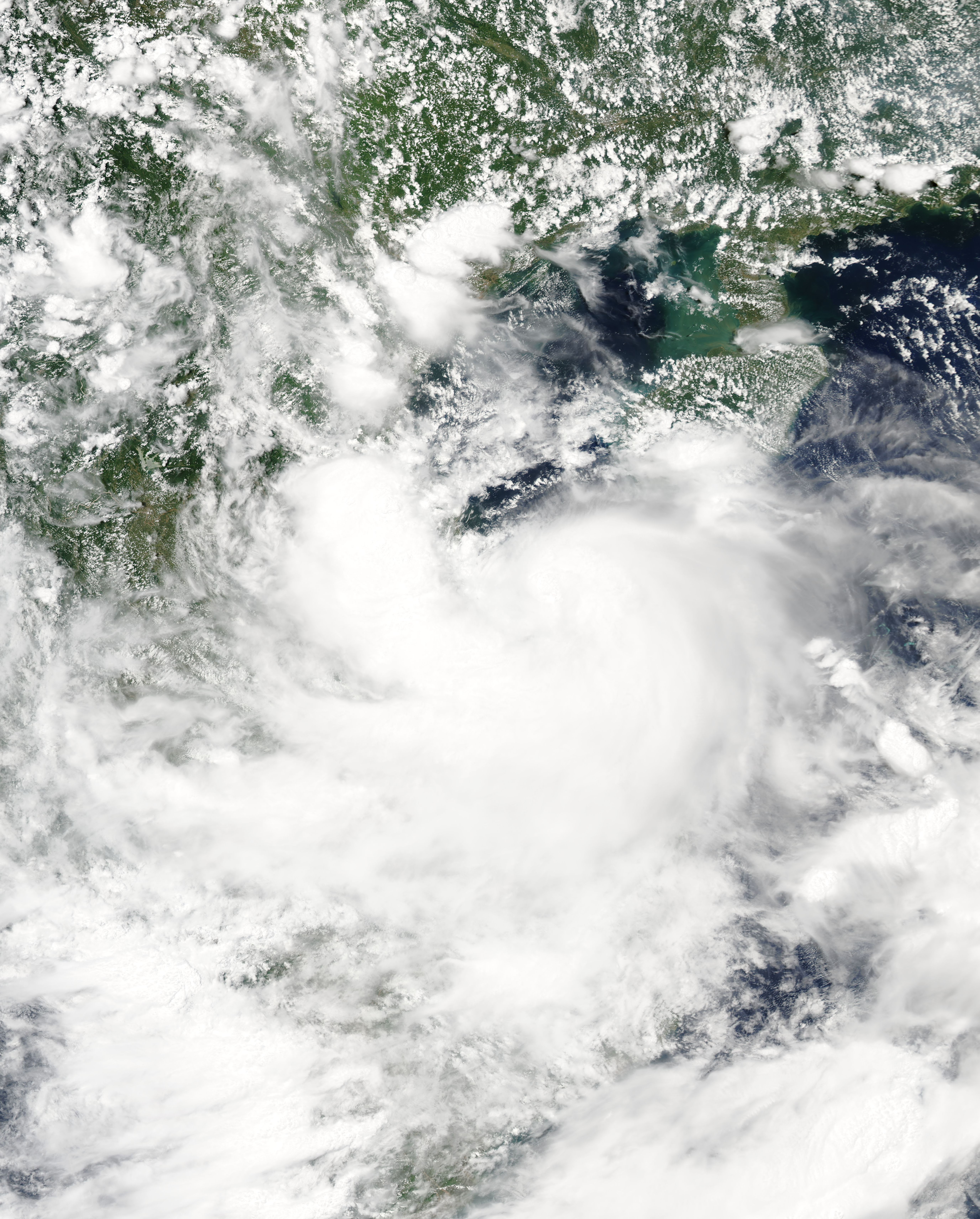
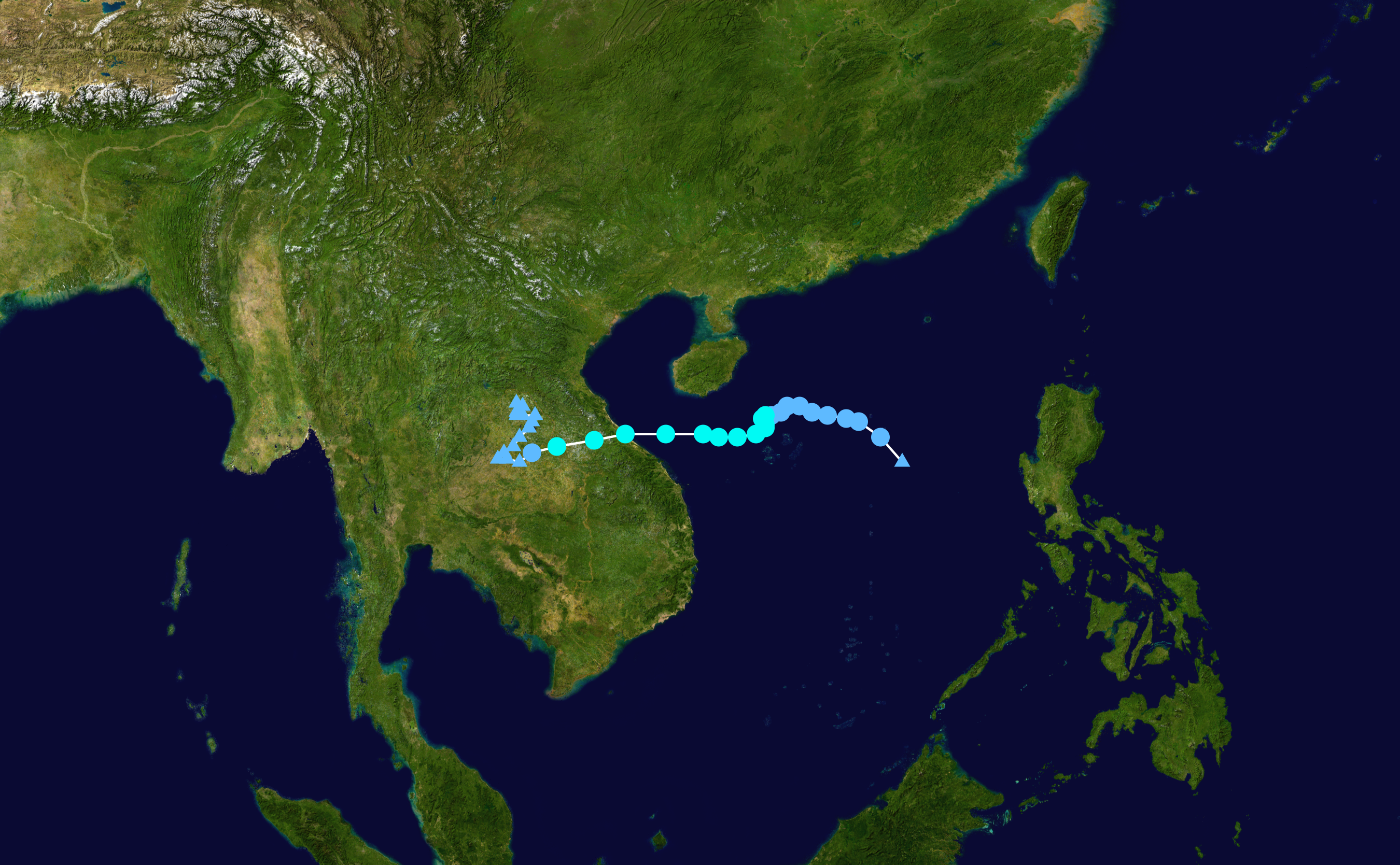
- Duration: July 21 – July 29
- Peak intensity: 65 km/h (40 mph) (10-min); 994 hPa (mbar)

On July 21, both the JMA and the JTWC reported that Tropical Depression 08W had developed approximately 582 km (362 mi) to the south of Hong Kong. After moving westward for a couple of days, the system strengthened into a tropical storm by both agencies while nearing the island province of Hainan, receiving the name Sonca. By July 24, Sonca reached its maximum intensity with a minimum pressure of 994 hPa. Early on July 25, the JTWC issued its final advisory as the system made landfall over in Quảng Trị Province, Vietnam. The JMA issued its final advisory a few hours later when it had weakened into a tropical depression, although Sonca maintained its intensity over land until it had fully dissipated on July 29.

Flooding in Northern Cambodia drowned two people, blocked many roads and flooded several hundred houses. Damage across Sakon Nakhon, Thailand exceeded 100 million baht (US$3 million) and killed 23 people across Thailand.

=== Tropical Storm Roke (Fabian) ===
- Tropical storm (JMA)
- Tropical storm (SSHWS)
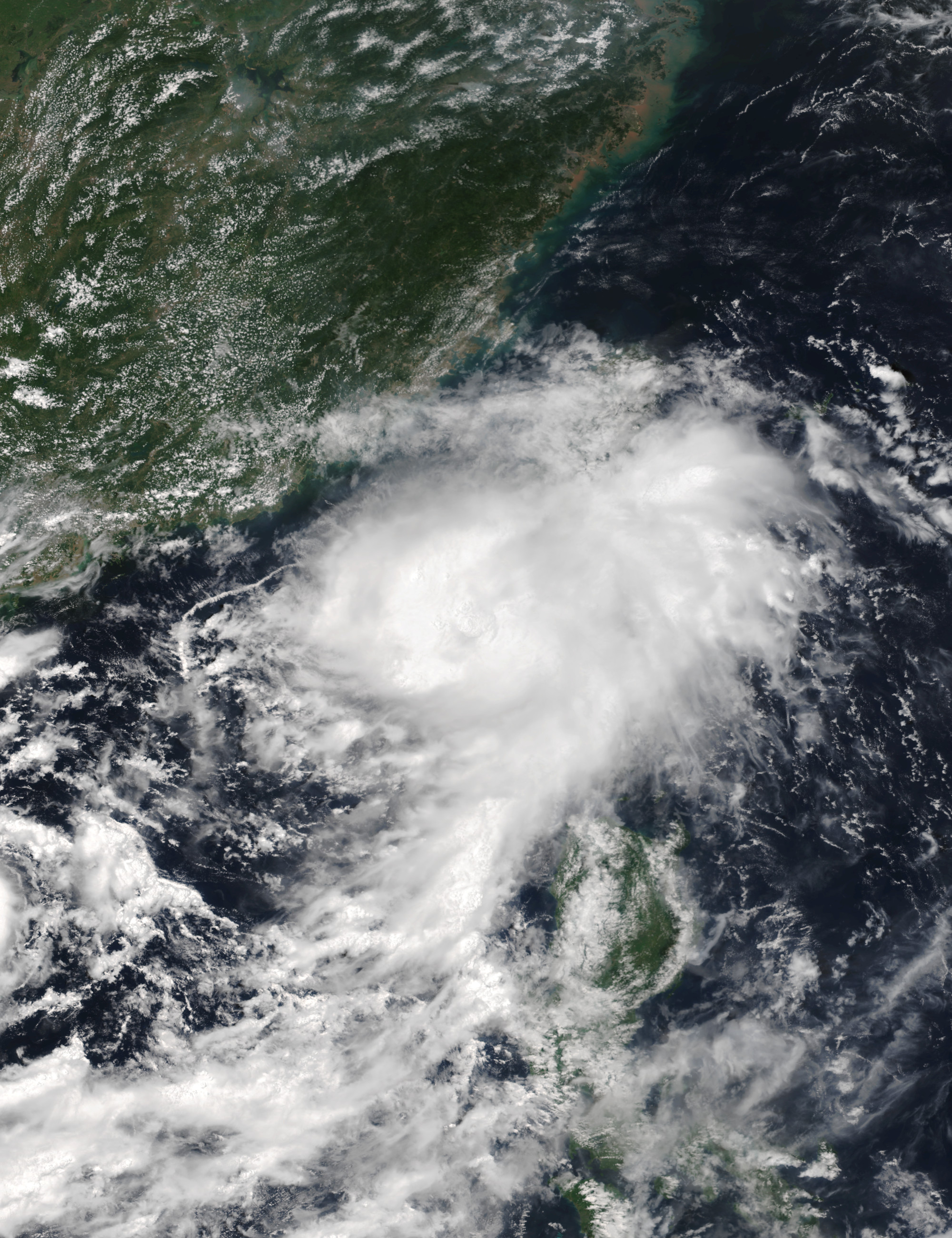
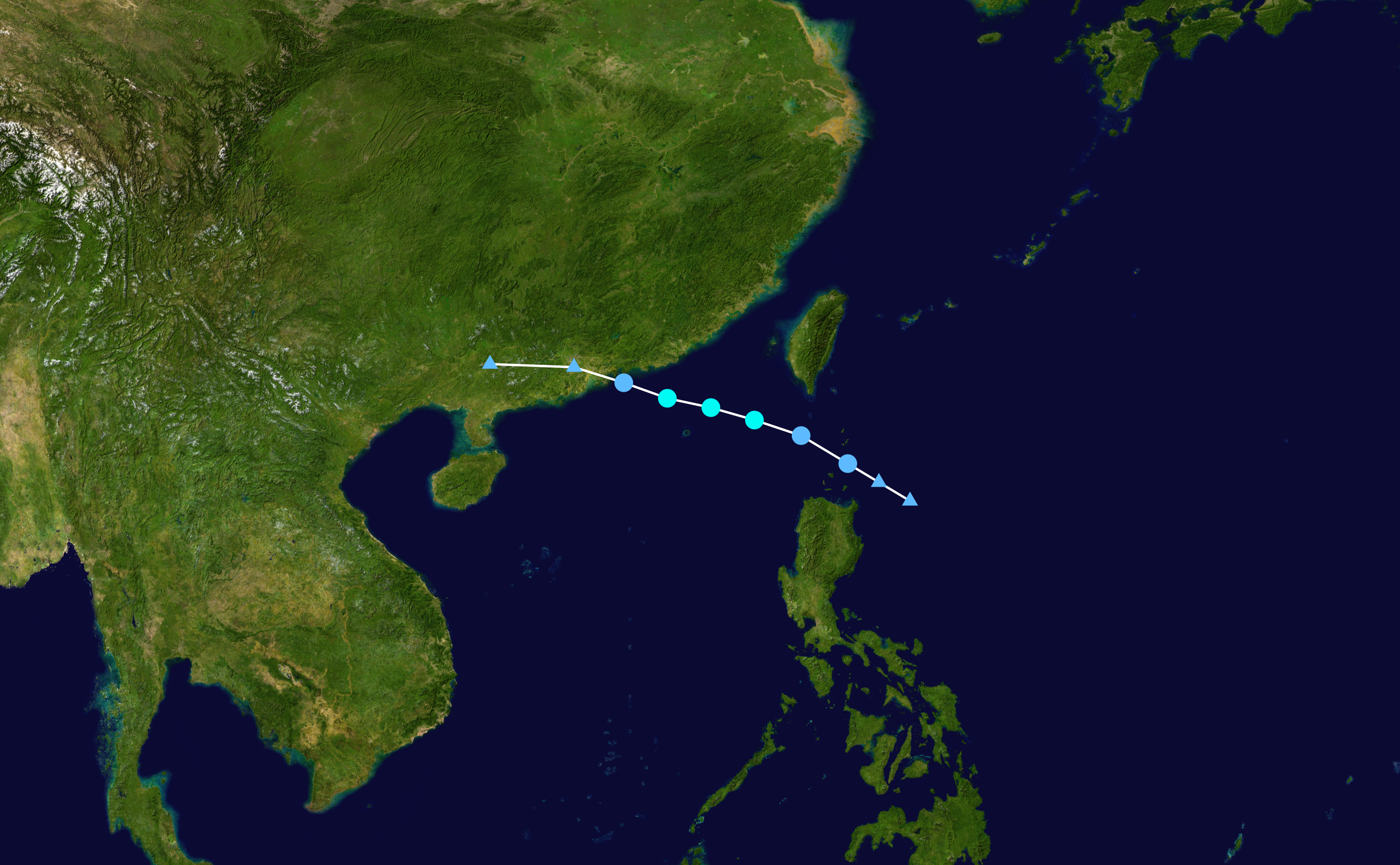
- Duration: July 21 – July 23
- Peak intensity: 65 km/h (40 mph) (10-min); 1002 hPa (mbar)

The JMA noted the formation of a tropical depression southeast of Taiwan early on July 21. Assigning the numerical designation 10W, the JTWC upgraded the system to a tropical depression at about 18:00 UTC the same day. The system traveled in a generally northwesterly direction, and passed through the Luzon Strait, between Taiwan and the Philippines. Around the same time, the PAGASA began issuing advisories on the depression, and contributed the unofficial name Fabian. Early the next day, after the system had emerged into the South China Sea, both the JMA and the JTWC upgraded the system to a tropical storm, naming it Roke. Roke assumed a more westerly course, and tracked obliquely towards China's Guangdong coast. The JTWC downgraded the system to a tropical depression just 12 hours later, at 18:00 UTC, but the JMA maintained the cyclone's category as a tropical storm. Roke made landfall just east of the Hong Kong central business district at about 01:30 UTC on July 23, and passed over Shenzhen one to two hours later. Roke weakened to a depression a few hours later, though the JMA declared that it had dissipated on 18:00 UTC of the same day.

Schools, businesses and government offices were closed in Hong Kong as the Hong Kong Observatory (HKO) raised its typhoon warning signal to 8—the third highest of five levels—in preparation for Tropical Storm Roke. Ferry services in the city were suspended, and more than 50 flights were delayed. However, winds in the city were relatively light and no significant damage was reported.

=== Typhoon Nesat (Gorio) ===
- Typhoon (JMA)
- Category 2 typhoon (SSHWS)
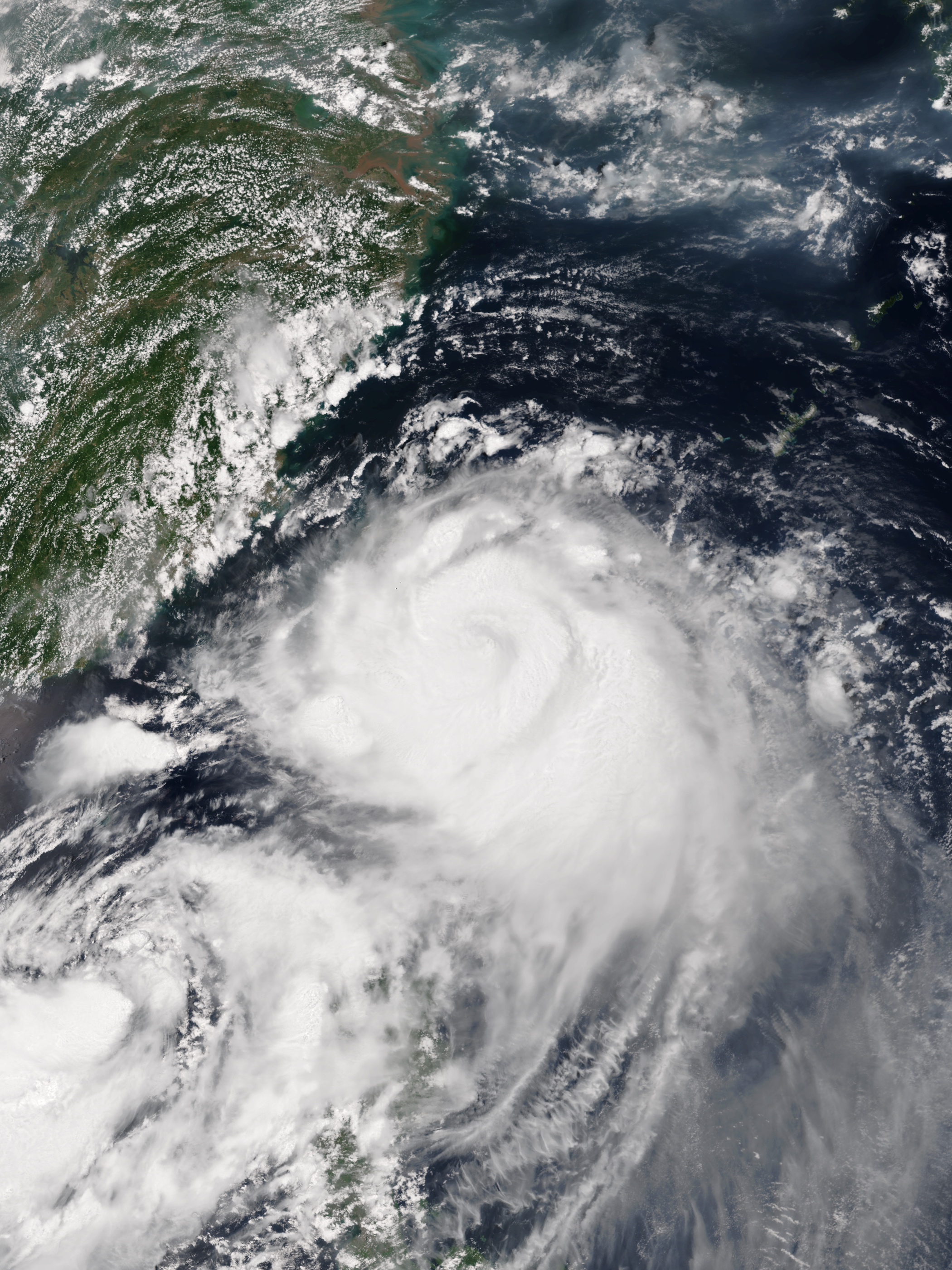
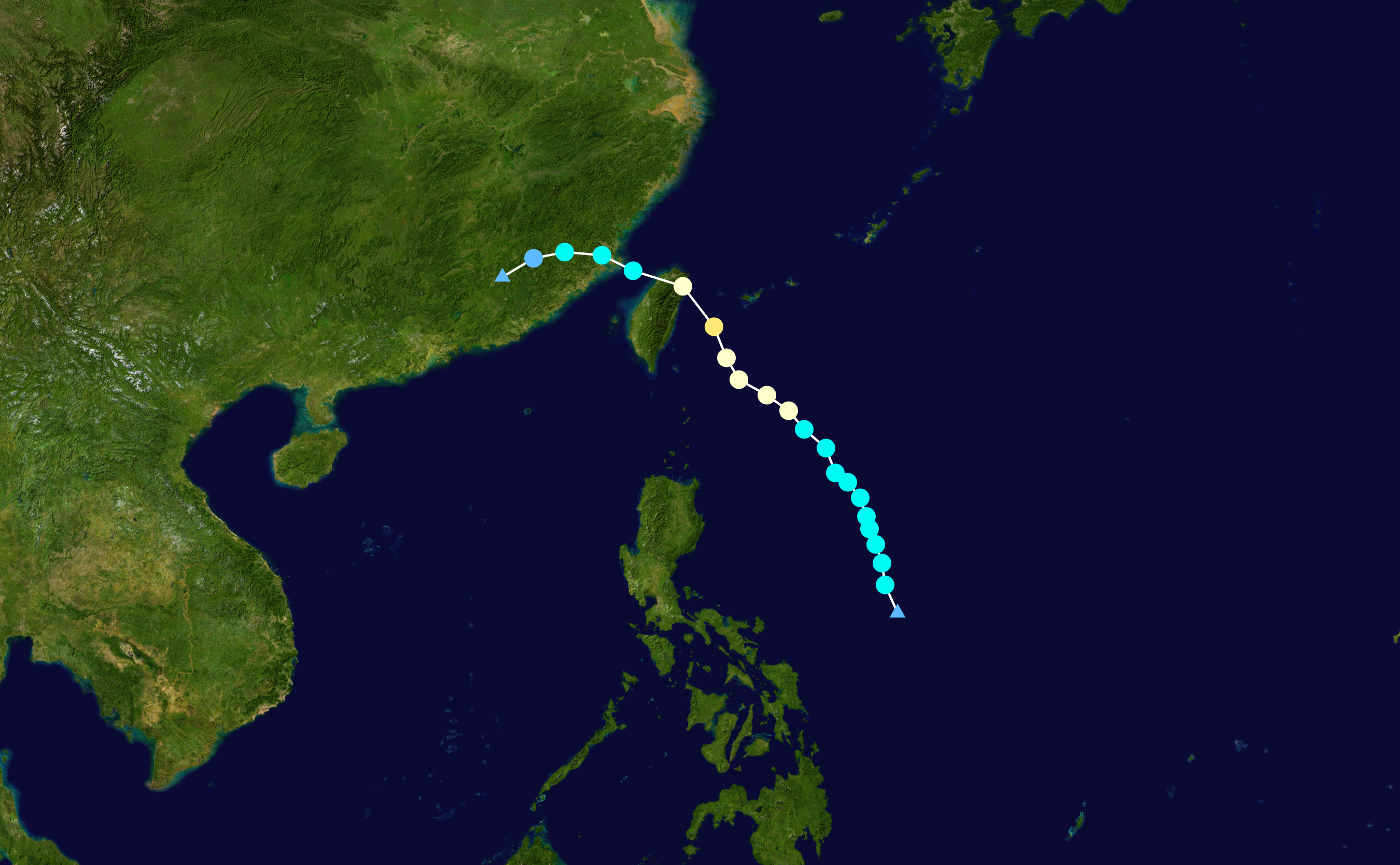
- Duration: July 25 – July 30
- Peak intensity: 150 km/h (90 mph) (10-min); 960 hPa (mbar)

The JMA upgraded a low-pressure area to a tropical depression east of the Philippines early on July 25. On July 26, it was named Gorio by PAGASA and later intensified into Tropical Storm Nesat. Nesat stalled in the Philippine Sea in the next couple of days and gradually intensified to become a severe tropical storm on July 27. It gradually strengthened until its peak on July 29, as a Category 1 typhoon. It then hit Taiwan, and began to weaken until its dissipation on July 30.

Despite the storm not making landfall in the Philippines, Nesat enhanced the southwest monsoon which brought torrential rainfall over most of the country. As of August 3, the NDRRMC had reported a total of ₱ 247.58 million (US$4.9 million) worth of damages. Total damages in Taiwan were counted to be NT$60.19 million (US$2.03 million). Total damages in mainland China were counted to be CNY 1.83 billion (US$271.6 million). Typhoon Nesat was originally a Category 1, but was upgraded by the Joint Typhoon Warning Center into a minimal Category 2.

=== Tropical Storm Haitang (Huaning) ===
- Tropical storm (JMA)
- Tropical storm (SSHWS)
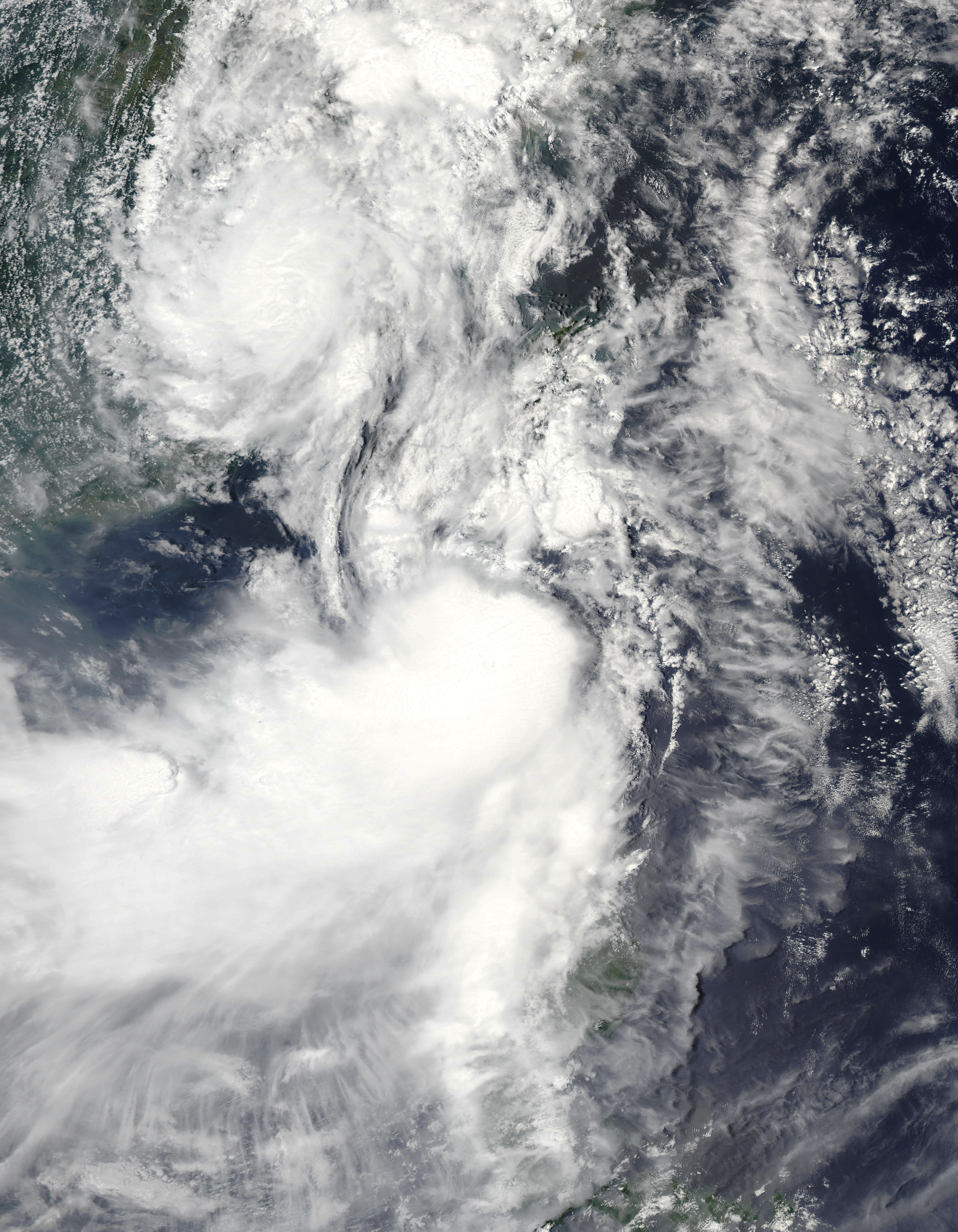
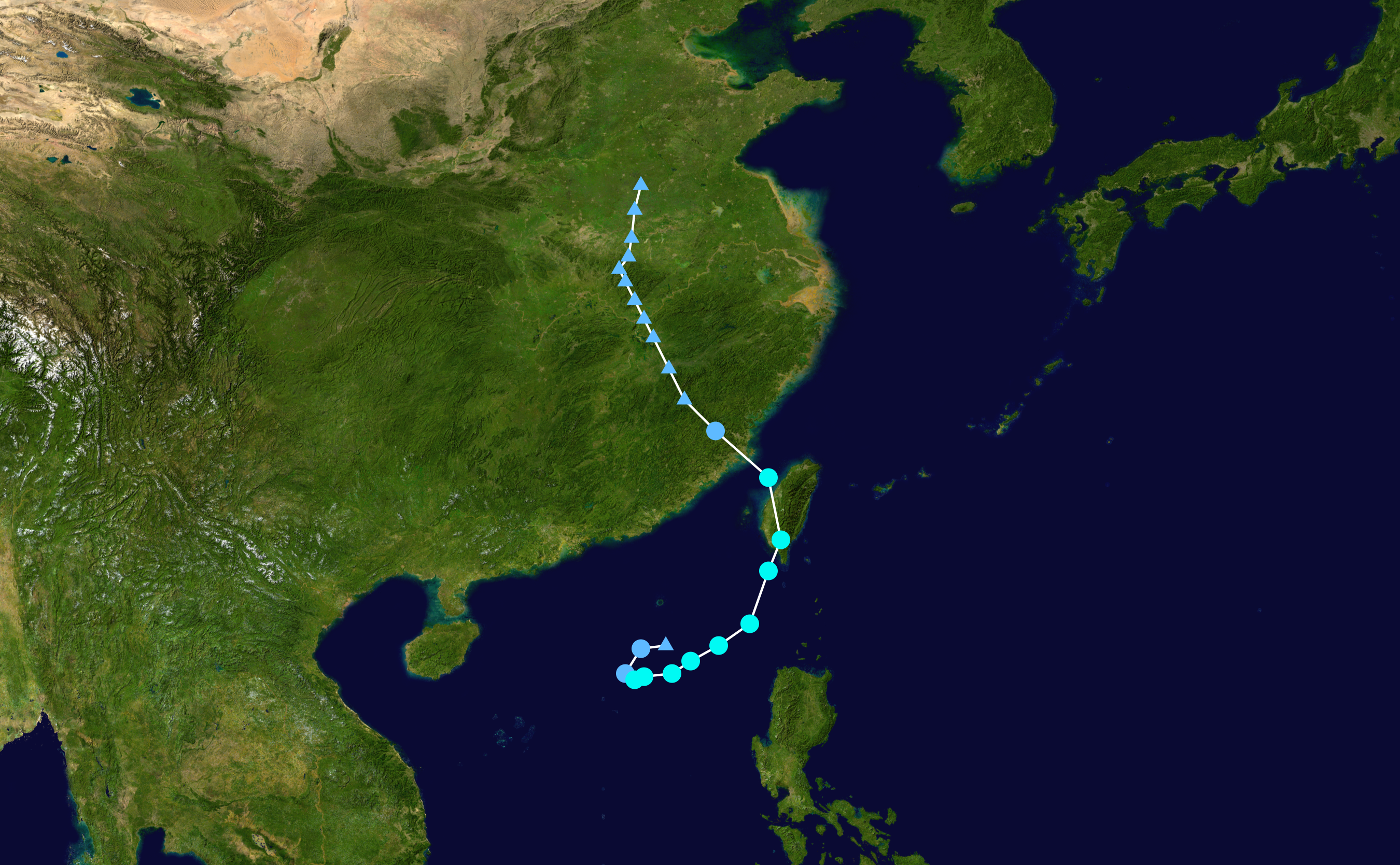
- Duration: July 27 – August 2
- Peak intensity: 85 km/h (50 mph) (10-min); 985 hPa (mbar)

A low-pressure area over the northern portion of the South China Sea was upgraded to a tropical depression by the JMA early on July 27. Despite an exposed LLCC with disorganized banding, the JTWC started initiating advisories, assigning the designation of 12W. During the next day, the system had strengthened into a tropical storm, with the JMA naming it as Haitang, after ASCAT image depicted 40 knot winds over in the southern portion of the storm. Due to the nearby Typhoon Nesat and moderate wind shear, Haitang maintained its intensity for several hours, until on July 30 when the system had deepened and reached its peak intensity with 10-minute sustained winds of 85 km/h (55 mph) with a minimum pressure of 985 hPa. Around the same time, Haitang entered the Philippine area of Responsibility, receiving the name Huaning by PAGASA, although the system had left the area during 12:00 UTC of the same day. Three hours later, the JTWC downgraded the system to a tropical depression, though it was re-upgraded into a tropical storm six hours later. By July 31, the JTWC issued their final advisory on Haitang after the system had made landfall over in the Pingtan County in Taiwan. During 06:00 UTC of that day, the JMA issued their final advisory after Haitang weakened into a remnant low.

=== Tropical Storm Nalgae ===
- Tropical storm (JMA)
- Tropical storm (SSHWS)
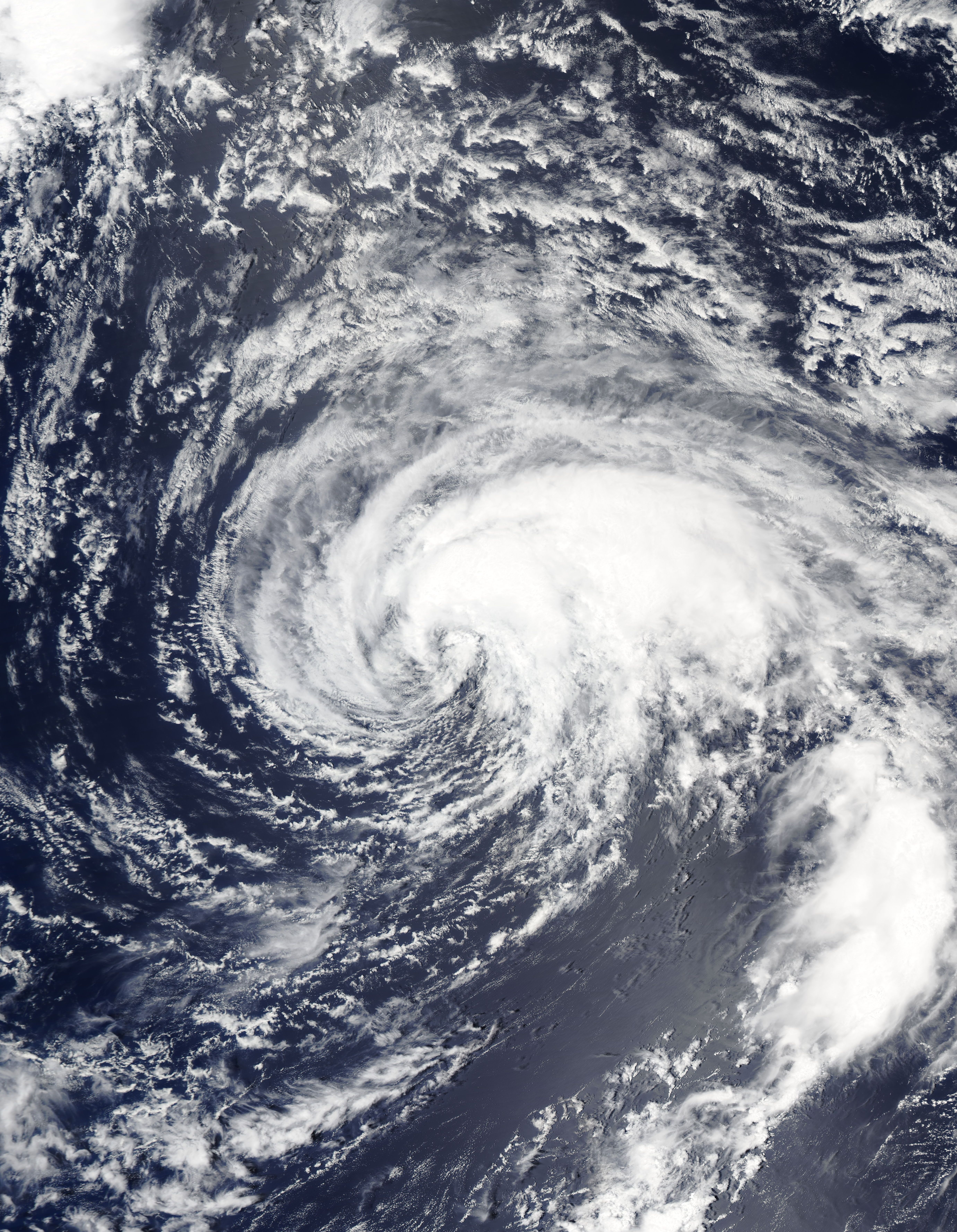
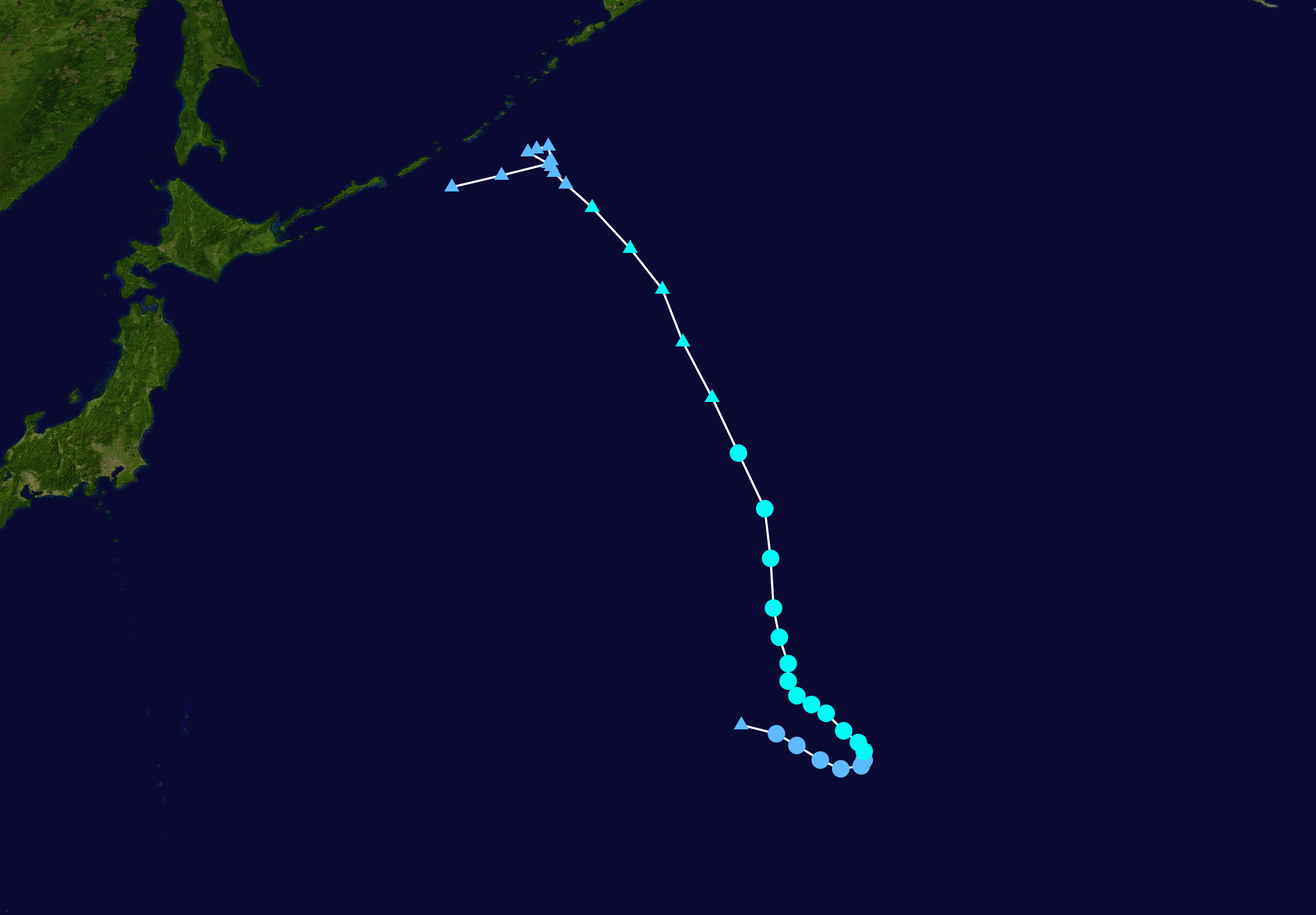
- Duration: July 31 – August 5
- Peak intensity: 85 km/h (50 mph) (10-min); 990 hPa (mbar)

During July 31, the JMA started to monitor a tropical depression located about 1,106 km (687 mi) to the northeast of Wake Island. During the next day, the JTWC started issuing advisories and designated it as 13W. By August 2, both agencies upgraded 13W to Tropical Storm Nalgae after imagery showed flaring convection and the storm was located in a region of low to moderate wind shear and warm SSTs. Moving in a northward direction, Nalgae slowly intensified for several days. Nalgae reached its peak intensity with 10-minute sustained winds of 85 km/h (55 mph) and a minimum barometric pressure of 988 hPa during August 5 for a brief time, as it was beginning to transition into an extratropical cyclone. The JTWC downgraded Nalgae to a tropical depression later that day and issued their final advisory after the storm was located in very unfavorable environments. The JMA followed suit early on August 6 when Nalgae fully transitioned into an extratropical cyclone, after which its remnants moved further north and were last noted during August 9.

=== Typhoon Banyan ===
- Typhoon (JMA)
- Category 3 typhoon (SSHWS)
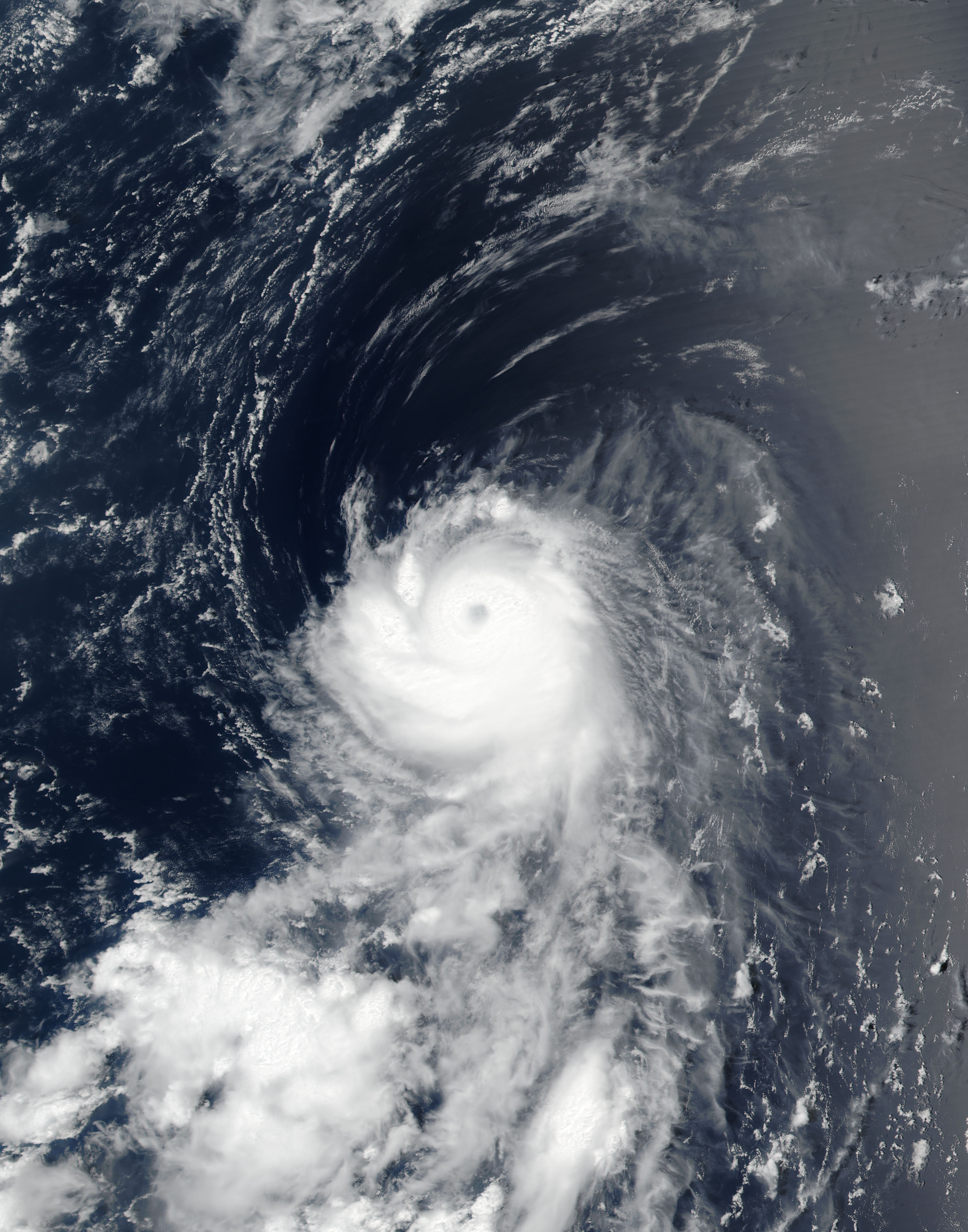
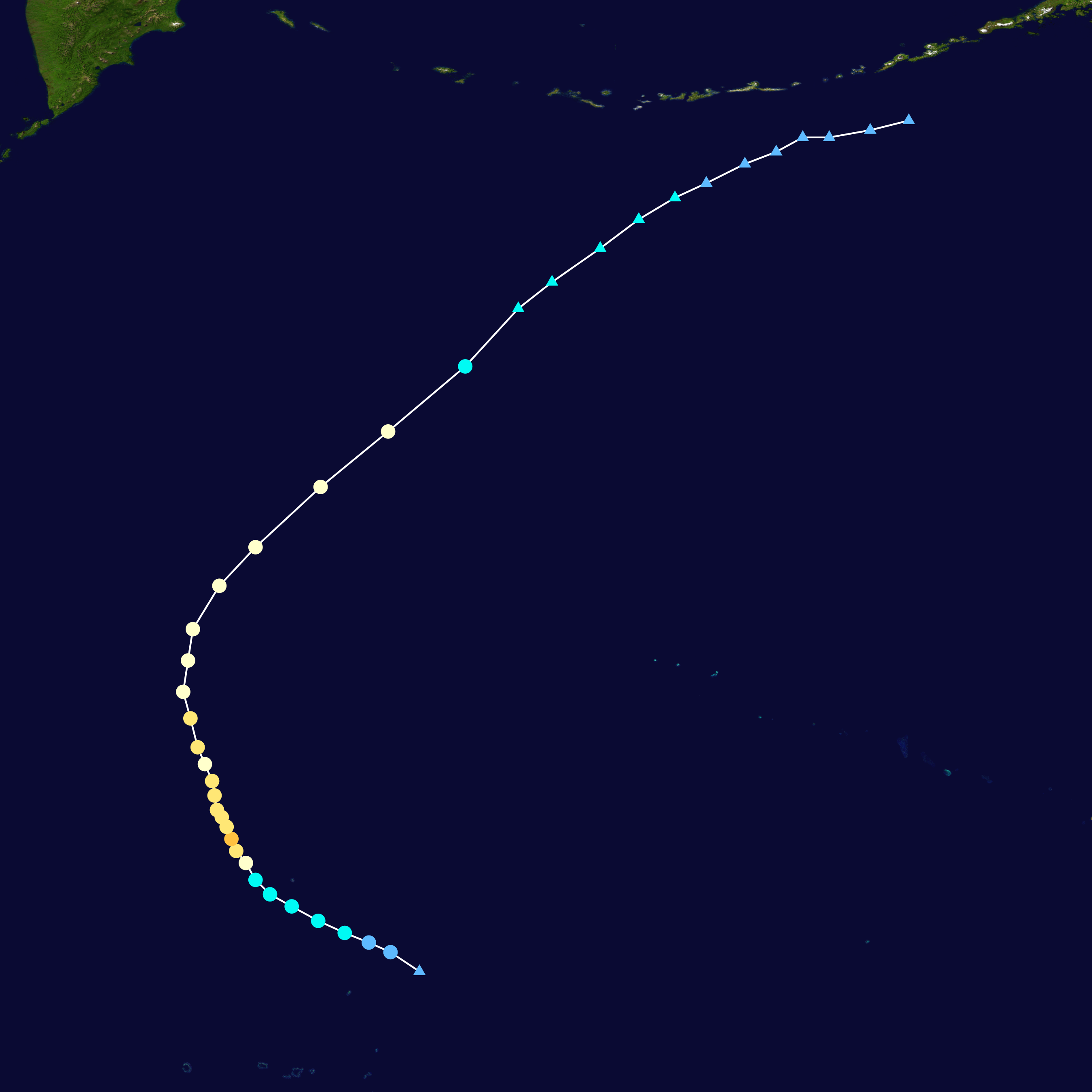
- Duration: August 10 – August 17
- Peak intensity: 150 km/h (90 mph) (10-min); 955 hPa (mbar)

On August 10, Tropical Depression 14W formed in the North Pacific Ocean. It strengthened into a tropical storm on August 11 at 5 p.m. EDT (2100 UTC), and was named Banyan. Rapid intensification occurred on Banyan, and it intensified into a typhoon on August 12 at 5 p.m. EDT (2100 UTC). Banyan reached its peak strength of 150 km/h (95 mph) on August 13, without harming any land, as a Category 3 equivalent system in a high latitude, like Typhoon Songda (2016). Banyan began to start weakening on August 14, and continue to rapidly weaken as it entered the frigid cold waters of the North Pacific. It weakened into an extratropical depression on August 17.

=== Typhoon Hato (Isang) ===
- Typhoon (JMA)
- Category 3 typhoon (SSHWS)
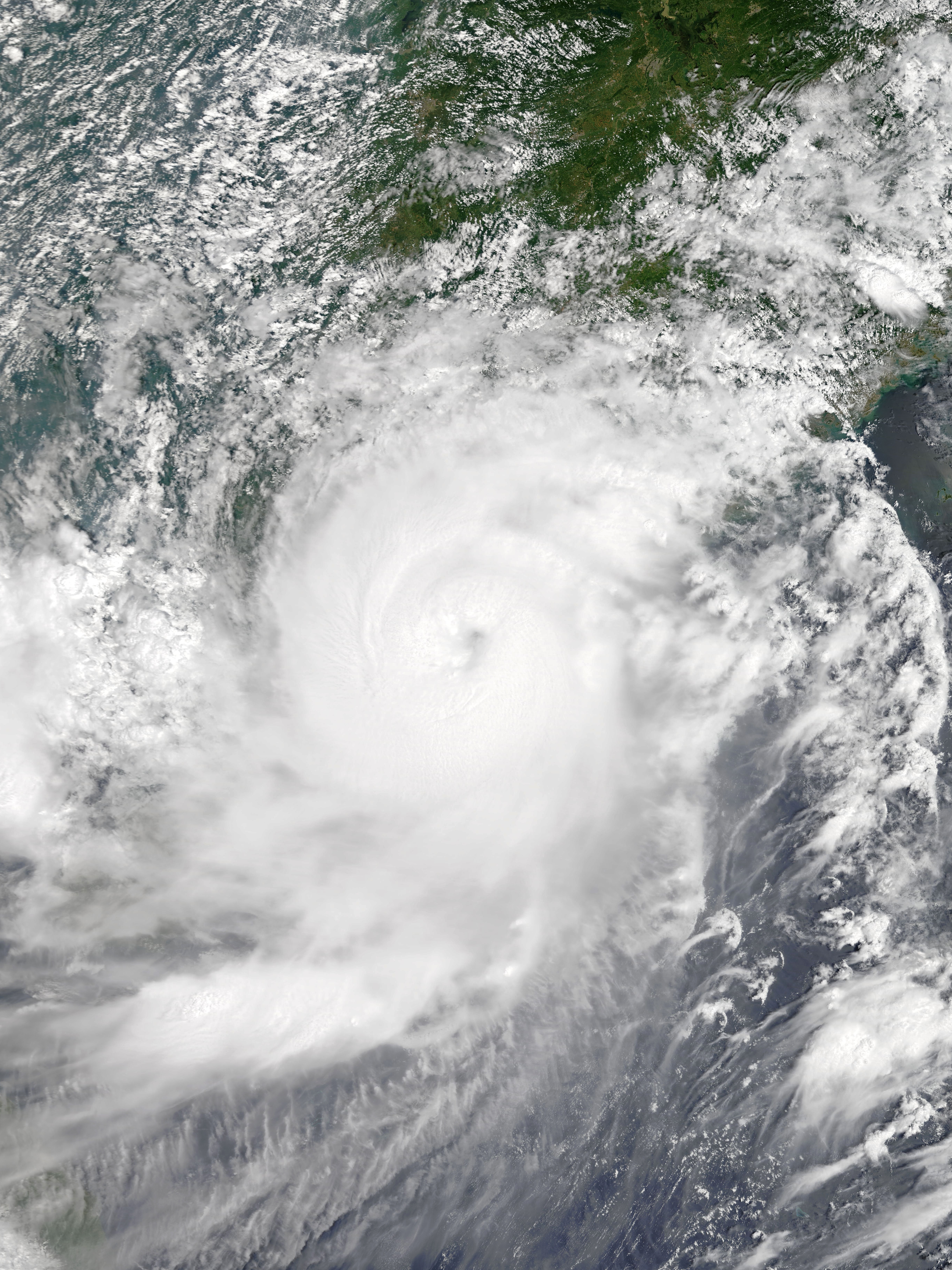
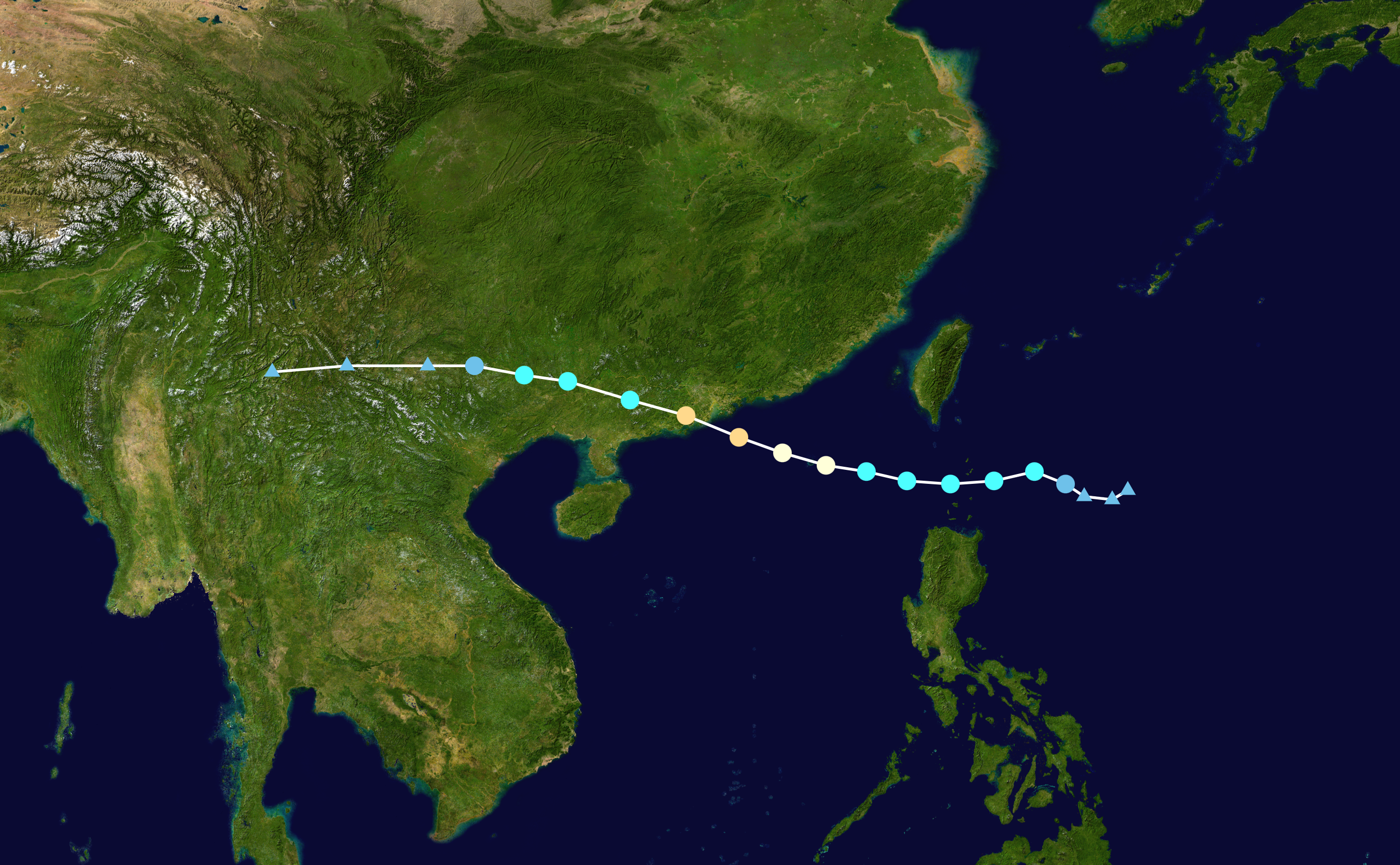
- Duration: August 19 – August 24
- Peak intensity: 140 km/h (85 mph) (10-min); 965 hPa (mbar)

A low-pressure area developed into a tropical depression on August 19, while located to the southeast of Taiwan, and was named by PAGASA as Tropical Depression Isang. Over the next few days, Isang became a tropical storm, and was named Hato. Hato then became a severe tropical storm as it passed through the Batanes region of the Philippines, and the PAGASA later issued its final warning as Hato (named Isang) moved out of the Philippine Area of Responsibility.

It gradually intensified and reached typhoon status on the afternoon of August 22 after entering the northeastern part of the South China Sea. On August 23, 07:00 HKT, Hato was approximately 100 km southeast of Hong Kong, bringing rain to the mainland as well as Hainan to the west. At 11:00 HKT the eye was approximately 60 km southwest of Hong Kong with the typhoon heading onto the mainland in a west-northwesterly direction.

Hong Kong Observatory issued Hurricane Signal No. 10 at 09:10 HKT, August 23, the first time since 2012. A total of 11 people were killed while total damage in mainland China were counted to CN¥28.91 billion (US$4.34 billion). No people were killed in Hong Kong, while estimated damage in Hong Kong amounted to HK$4 billion (US$511 million). In Macau, losses of 12.50 billion patacas (US$1.55 billion) were incurred when high tides exacerbated flooding in most of the low-lying areas, inundating ground floor shops and businesses. There were 12 deaths as a result of the typhoon, including a number of people who drowned in flooded underground car-parks. Despite making landfall in South China, Hato triggered floods in northern Vietnam and killed 1 person. The total damage by heavy rainfall in Bắc Kạn Province was 31 billion₫ (US$1.36 million). In total, there were 24 deaths attributed to the typhoon.

=== Severe Tropical Storm Pakhar (Jolina) ===
- Severe tropical storm (JMA)
- Tropical storm (SSHWS)
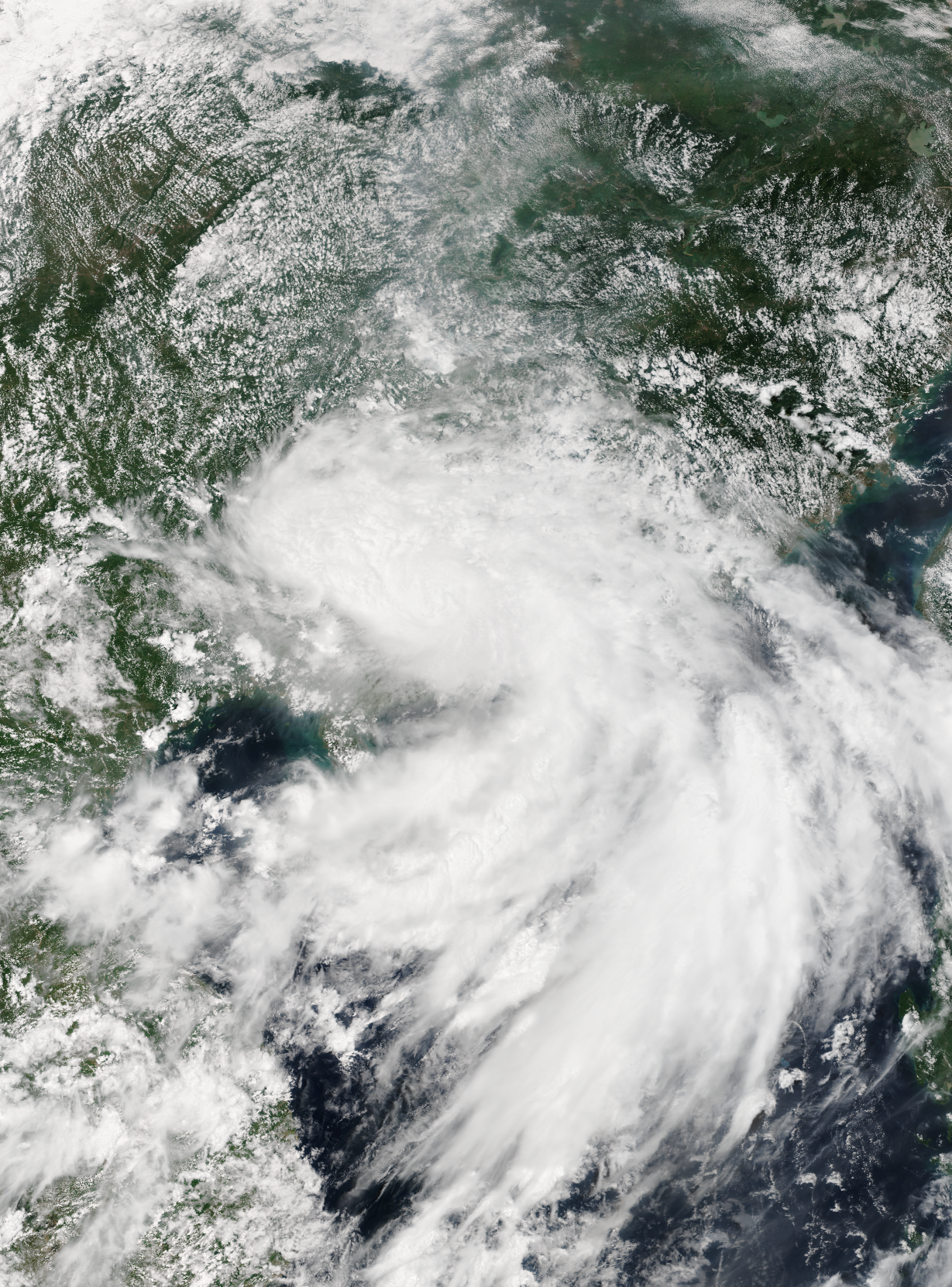
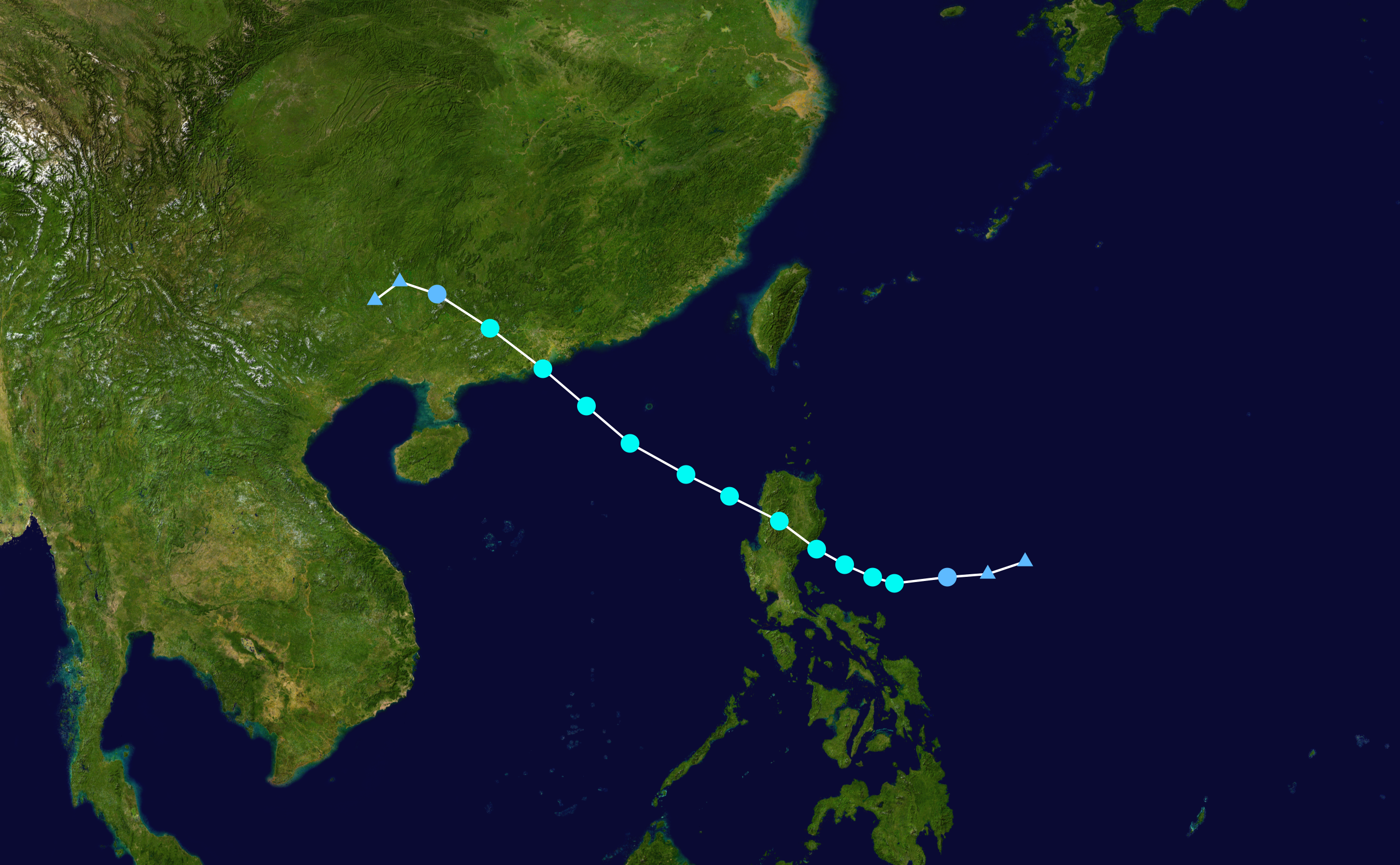
- Duration: August 24 – August 28
- Peak intensity: 100 km/h (65 mph) (10-min); 985 hPa (mbar)

On August 24, a tropical depression formed in the Philippine Sea and was named Jolina by PAGASA. On the next day, Jolina intensified into a tropical storm, and was named Pakhar. On August 26, Pakhar passed over the Philippines heading westward toward mainland China where it gathered strength into a severe tropical storm before making landfall in Tianshan on August 27, where after the previous monster storm Typhoon Hato hit days ago, they raised Signal #8 for Pakhar's arrival and landfall. Pakhar rapidly dissipated the next day.

A total of 83,000 people were affected by the storm, along with 14,000 people in which were evacuated over in the four main affected regions of Guandong, Guangxi, Guizhou and Yunnan. One person died from a traffic incident while 62 were injured, while an additional two were confirmed hours later.

Total economic losses in South China amounted to CN¥760 million (US$114.4 million) while a total of twelve people were killed in relation to the storm. Moreover, damages in the Philippines were recorded at ₱41.27 million (US$808 thousand) and 2 billion₫ (US$88,000) in Vietnam.

=== Typhoon Sanvu ===
- Typhoon (JMA)
- Category 2 typhoon (SSHWS)
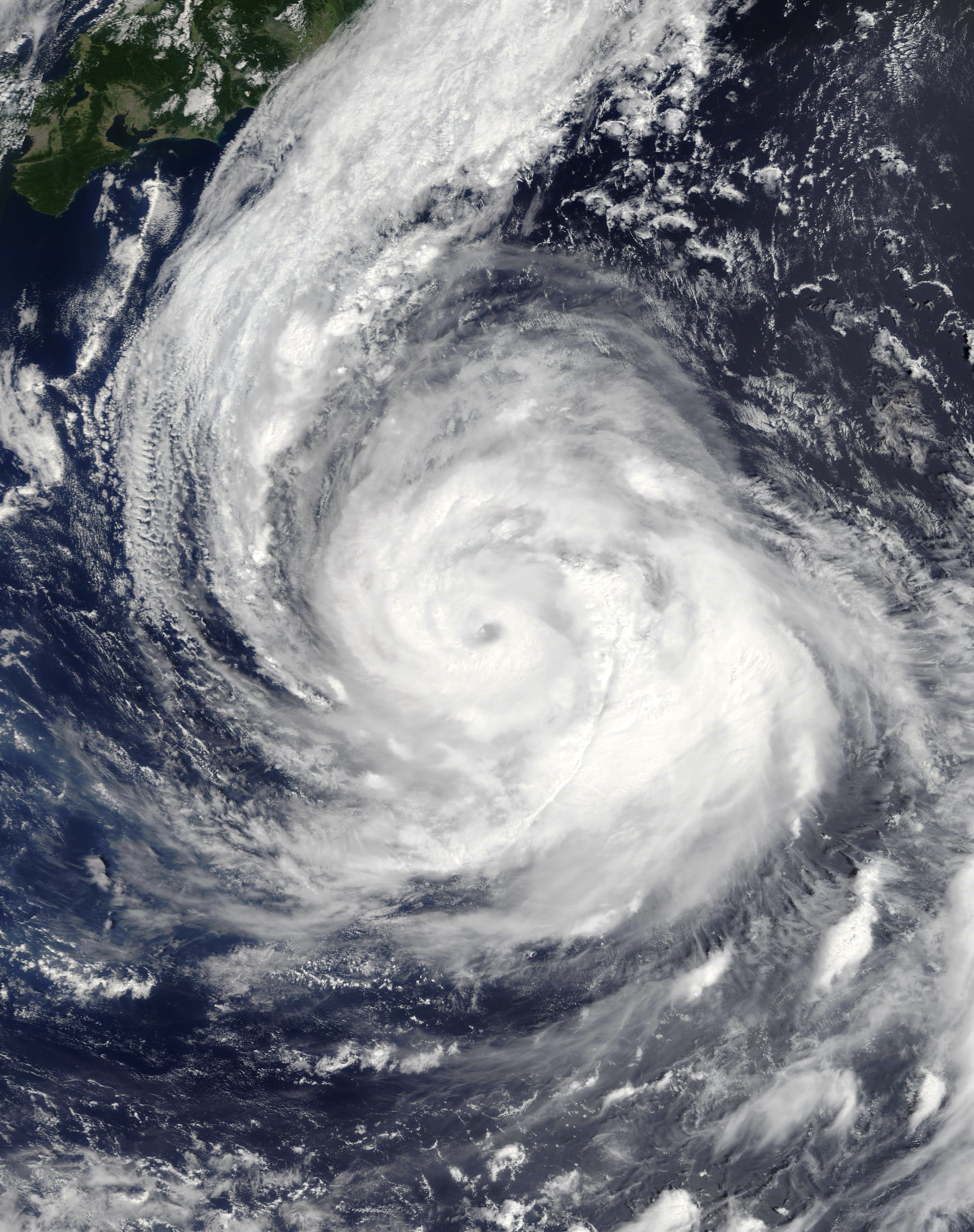
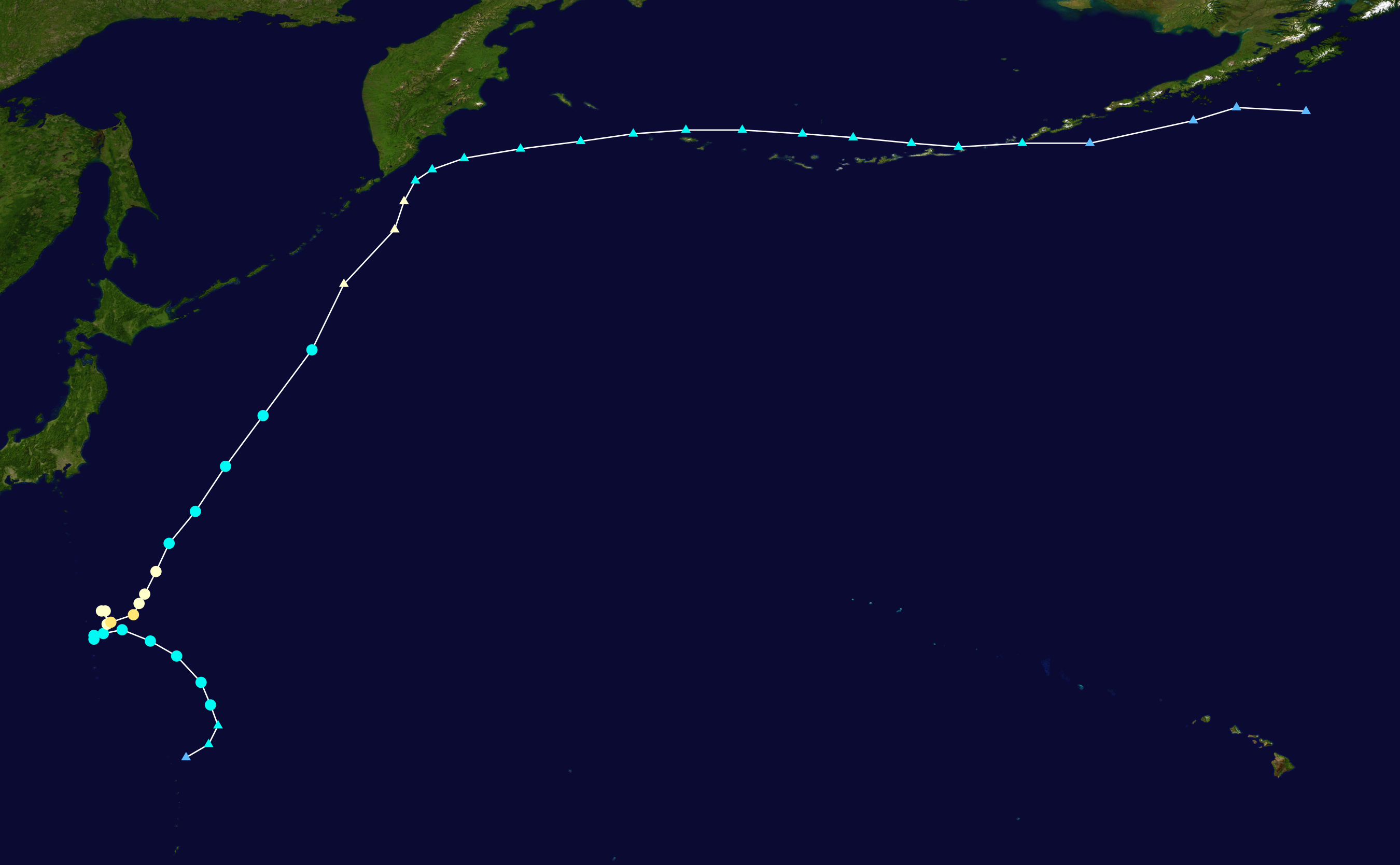
- Duration: August 26 – September 3
- Peak intensity: 150 km/h (90 mph) (10-min); 955 hPa (mbar)

On August 27, the JMA began to monitor a tropical depression that had developed about 441 km (274 mi) north-northeast of Saipan, although the system's nature was more of a monsoon depression. The JTWC followed suit on the following day, designating the system as 17W. Around the same time, the system had intensified into Tropical Storm Sanvu. By August 29, Sanvu increased in size, and therefore it prompted the JMA to upgrade it to a severe tropical storm. After moving in a westward direction, Sanvu stalled and entered a region of favorable conditions. As a ragged eye developed, both agencies upgraded Sanvu to a typhoon during August 31. Sanvu reached its peak intensity on September 1 as a Category 2 typhoon. Thereafter, the system steadily weakened as it started to move northwards with JTWC immediately downgrading the system to a tropical storm and issuing their final advisory late on September 2. The JMA still classified Sanvu as a typhoon until they issued their final advisory as the system had transitioned into an extratropical cyclone on September 3.

Sanvu did not cause any significant damage in the Northern Mariana Islands, though a 33-year-old woman drowned at Obyan beach in Saipan due to large waves on August 29.

=== Severe Tropical Storm Mawar ===
- Severe tropical storm (JMA)
- Tropical storm (SSHWS)
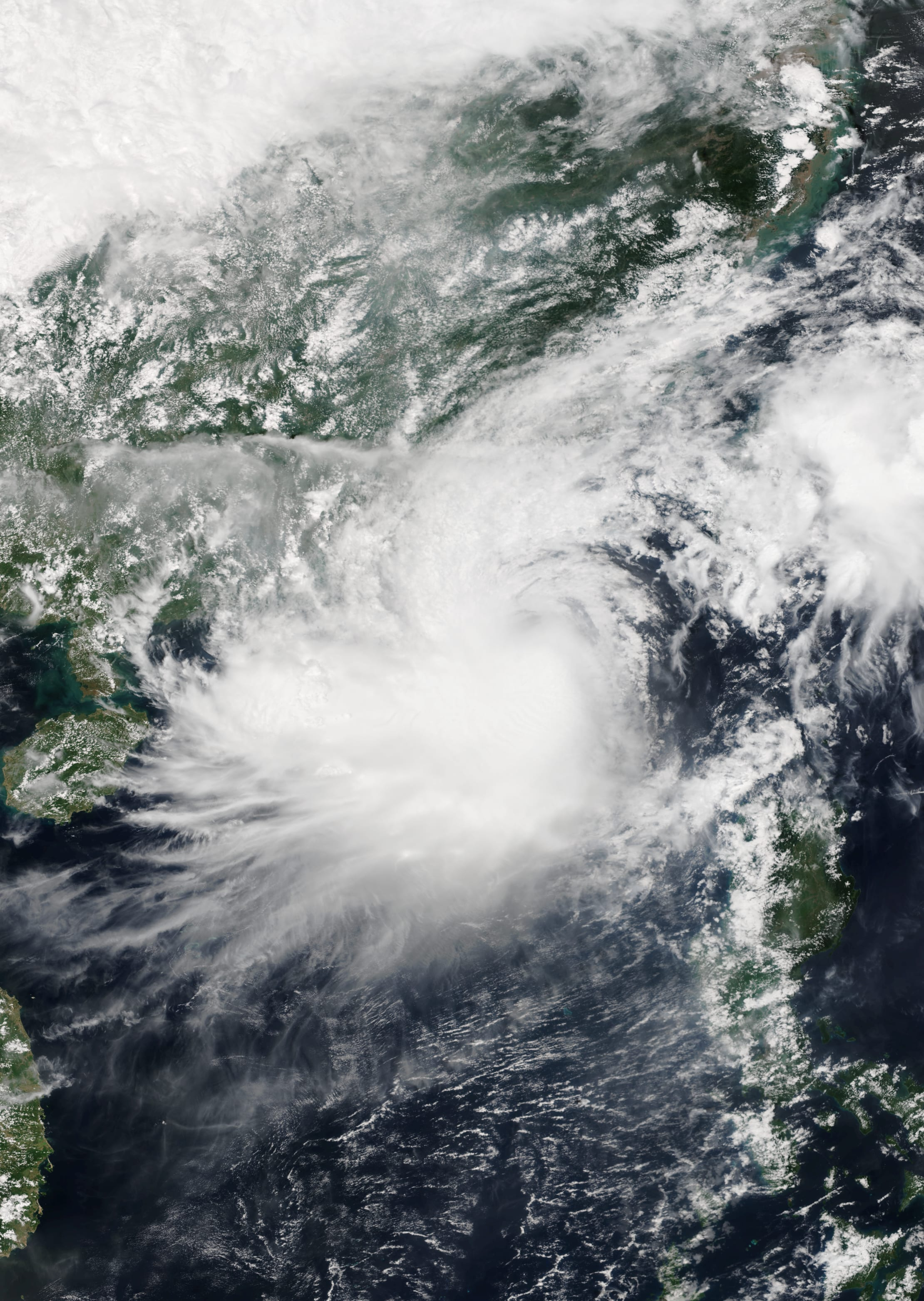
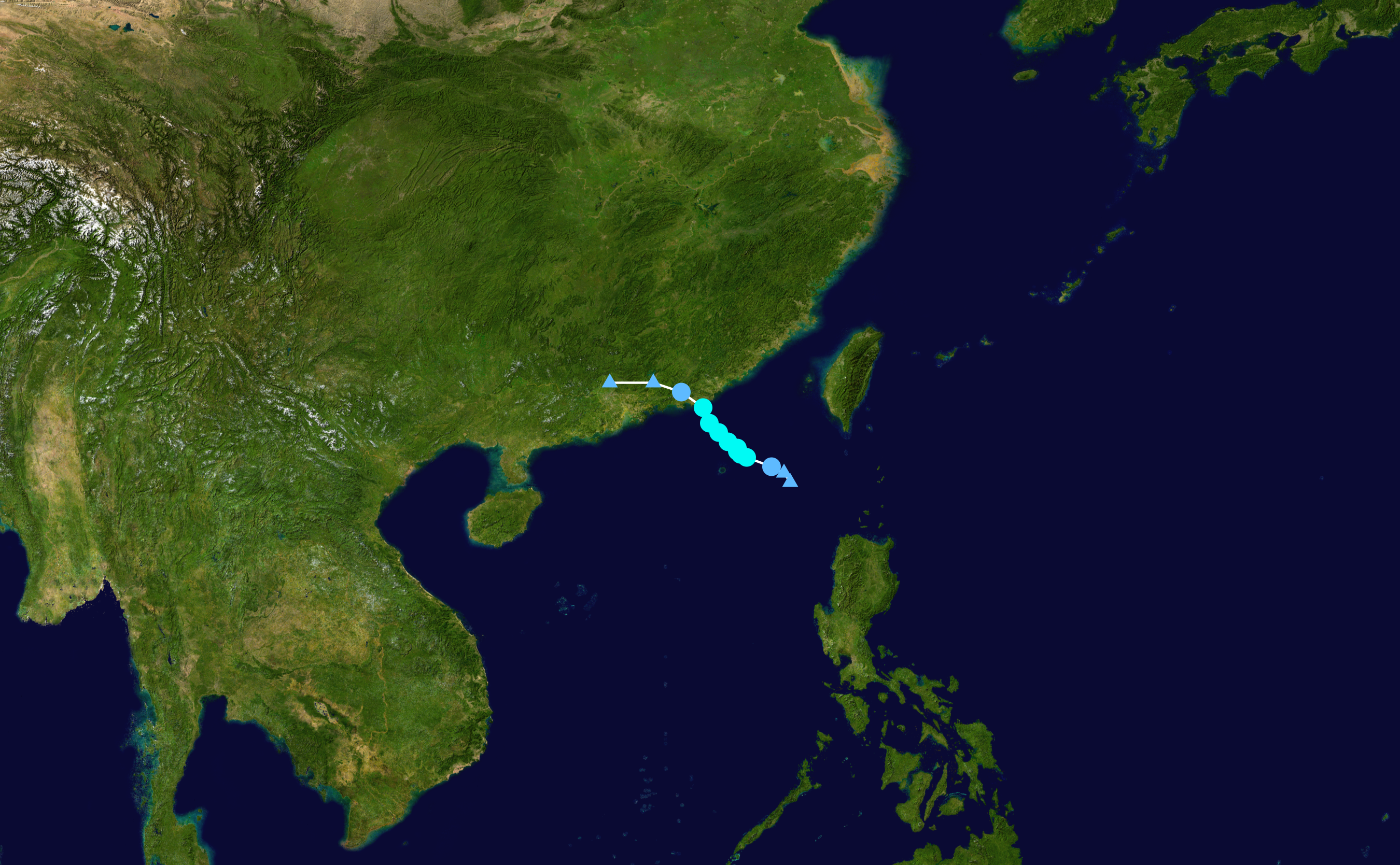
- Duration: August 30 – September 4
- Peak intensity: 95 km/h (60 mph) (10-min); 990 hPa (mbar)

On August 30, the JMA started to track a tropical depression to the north-northeast of Luzon, Philippines. Given the international designation of 18W by the JTWC, the JMA upgraded the system immediately to Tropical Storm Mawar. Slowly organizing, convection had rapidly developed and Mawar strengthened into a severe tropical storm early on September 2. On September 3, Mawar had weakened to a tropical storm after environments started to become unfavorable due to high wind shear. Later that day, Mawar weakened to a tropical depression and the JTWC issued their final advisory while making landfall over in Southeastern China between the cities of Shanwei and Shantou. The JMA followed suit early on September 4 when Mawar had fully dissipated.

The China's National Meteorological Center (NMC) issued a blue alert for the southern parts of Guangdong on September 1. During 2:00 a.m. local time on September 2, the Hong Kong Observatory issued a Tropical Cyclone Warning Signal No. 1 over in Hong Kong. Chinese authorities activated a natural disaster alert and response to help local civil affairs departments in areas such as the provinces of Fujian and Guandong to prepare for relief work. By September 3, the NMC had raised their warning signal to a yellow alert. Flooding from Mawar was a major concern with reports of rainfall of up to 80 millimetres (3.1 in) in some places which were impacted by Hato and Pakhar. Total economic losses in South China were counted to be CNY 10 million (US$1.53 million).

=== Tropical Storm Guchol (Kiko) ===
- Tropical storm (JMA)
- Tropical depression (SSHWS)
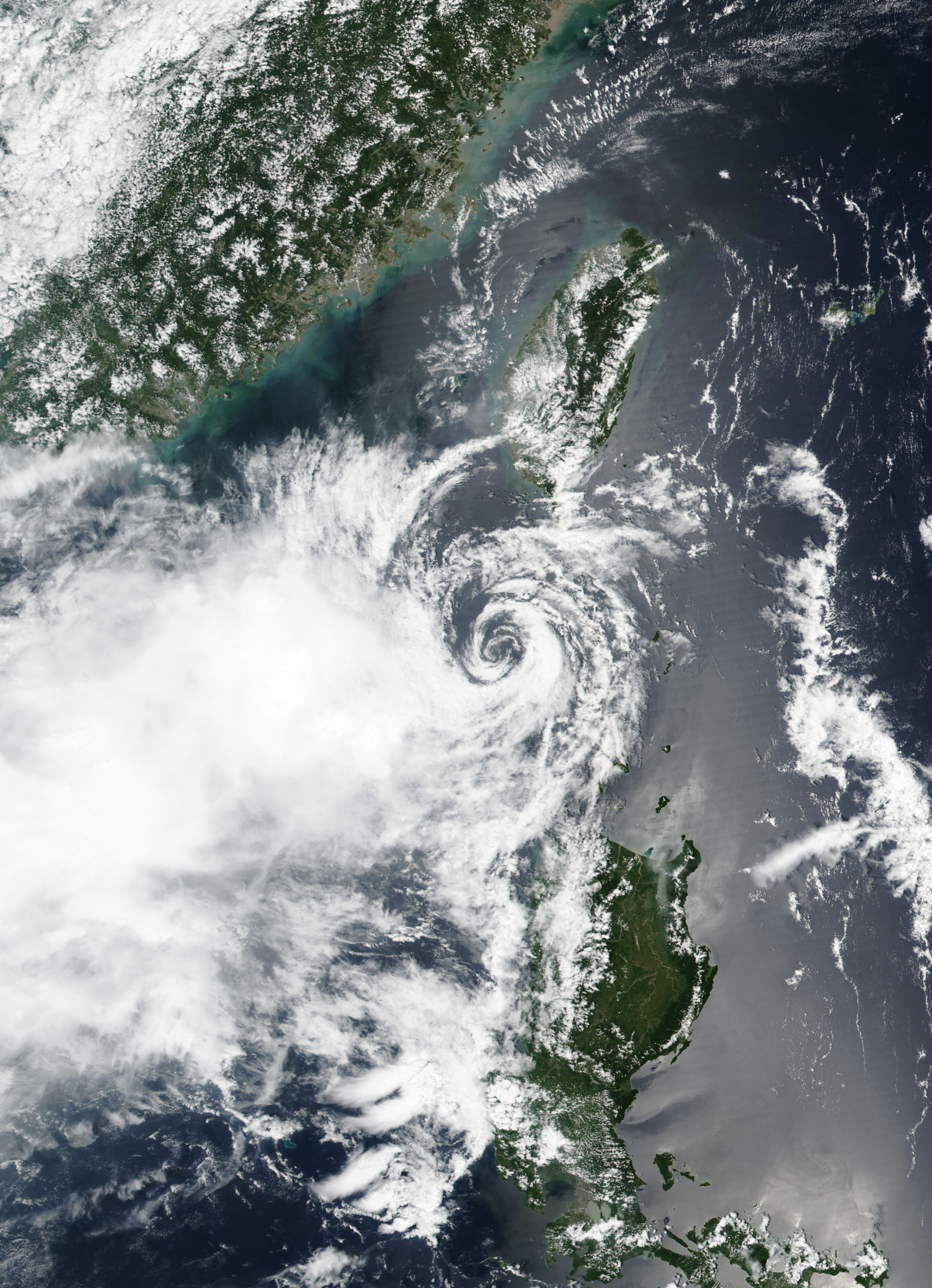
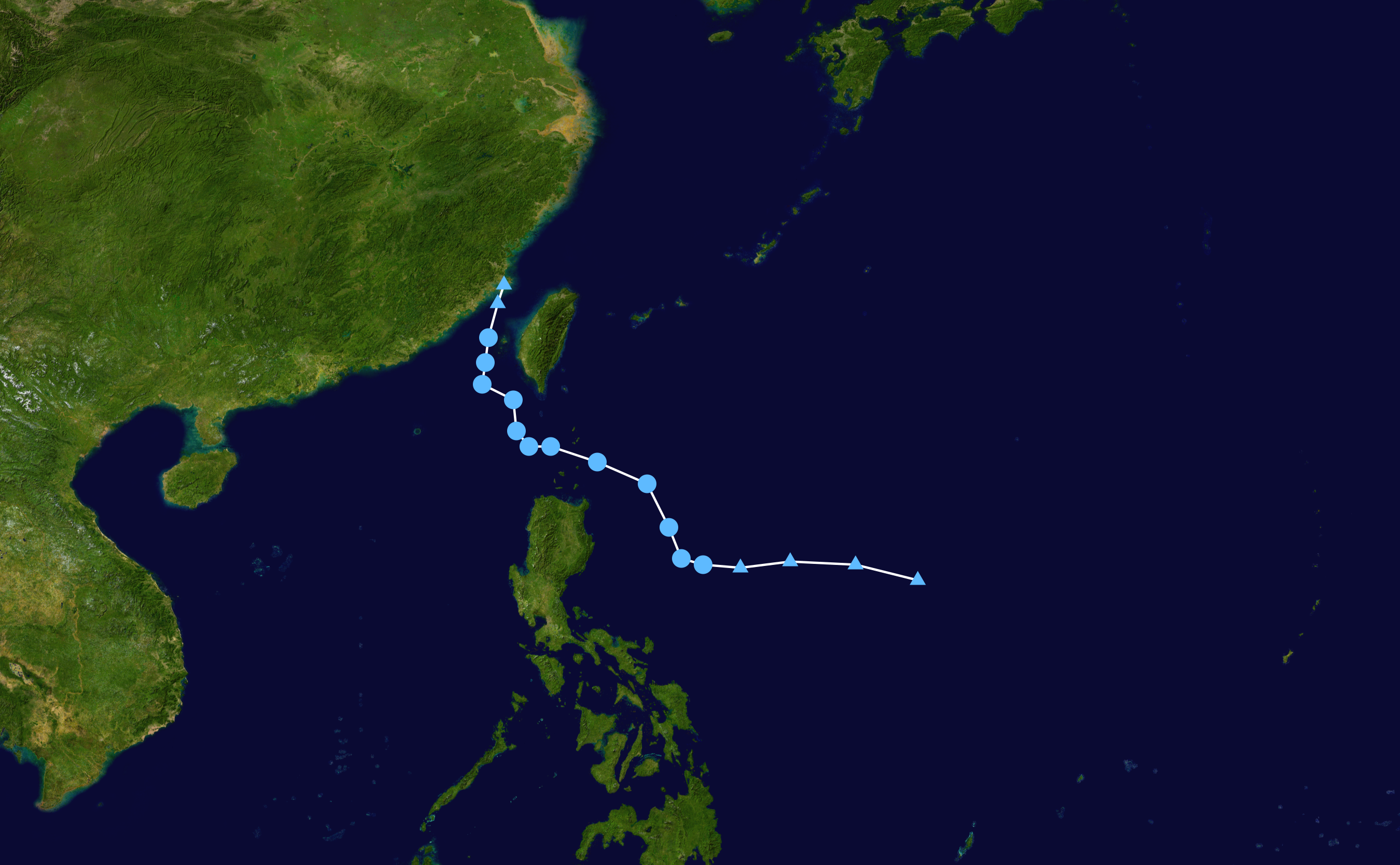
- Duration: September 3 – September 7
- Peak intensity: 65 km/h (40 mph) (10-min); 1000 hPa (mbar)

On September 3, the JMA started to track a tropical depression that had developed to the east of Luzon, Philippines. During the next day, the PAGASA initiated advisories and gave the local name Kiko, while the JTWC followed suit by giving it the designation 19W. However, due to increased wind shear along with an exposed circulation, the JTWC issued its final advisory on 03:00 UTC September 5. Several hours later, deep convection was depicted and despite moderate to high shear, the JTWC re-initiated advisories, while the JMA had upgraded the system to a tropical storm, naming it as Guchol early on the next day. On 21:00 UTC of that day, the JTWC stopped issuing warnings on the system after convection significantly weakened. JMA later followed suit early on the next day by declaring it a remnant low as it neared Putian, Fujian on Strait of Taiwan. The remnant low would then make landfall over Pingtan County of Fujian in China late on the following day before it transitioned into an extratropical storm near Zhejiang as it merged with the cold front on September 8.

=== Typhoon Talim (Lannie) ===
- Very strong typhoon (JMA)
- Category 4 typhoon (SSHWS)
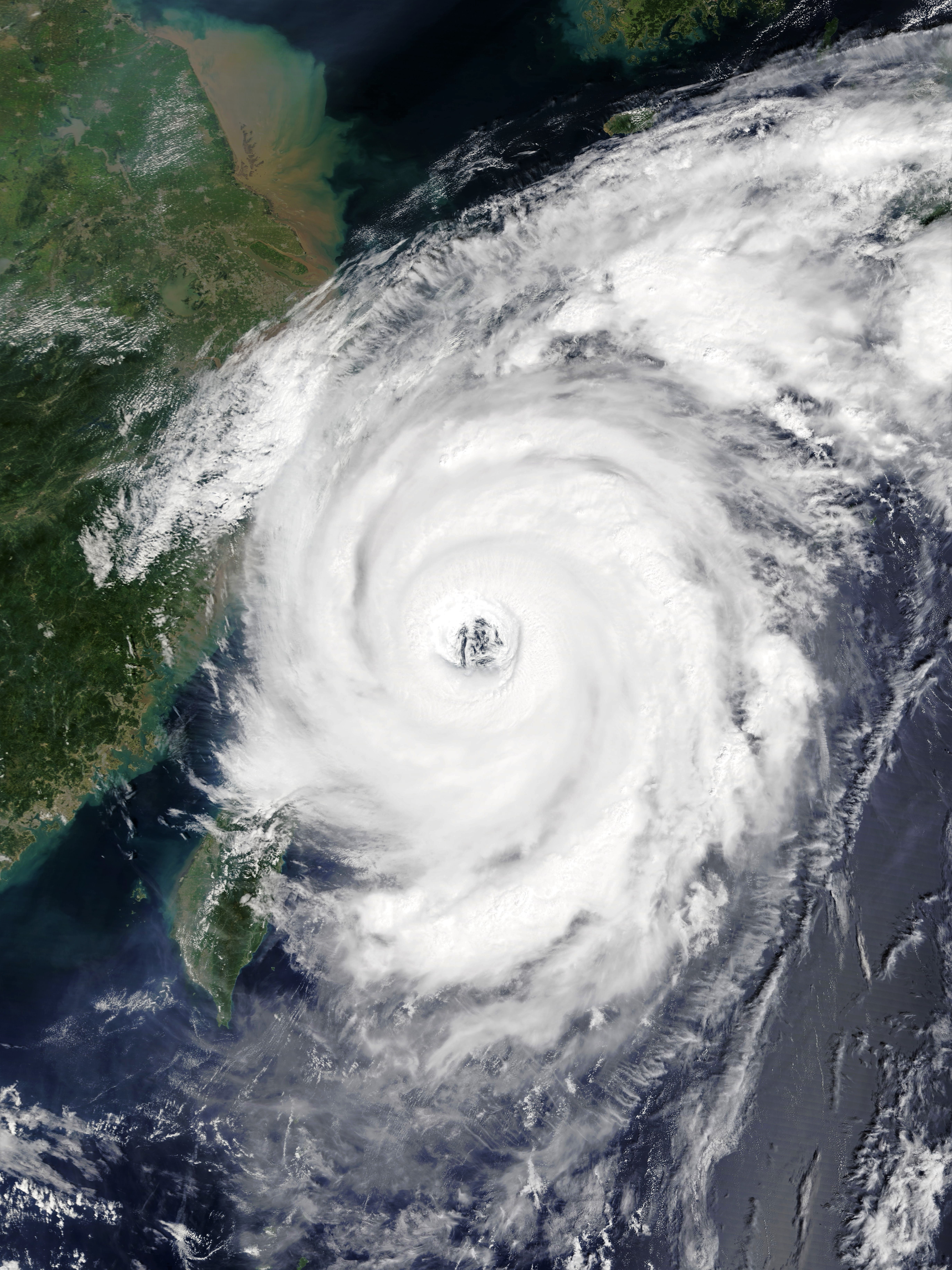
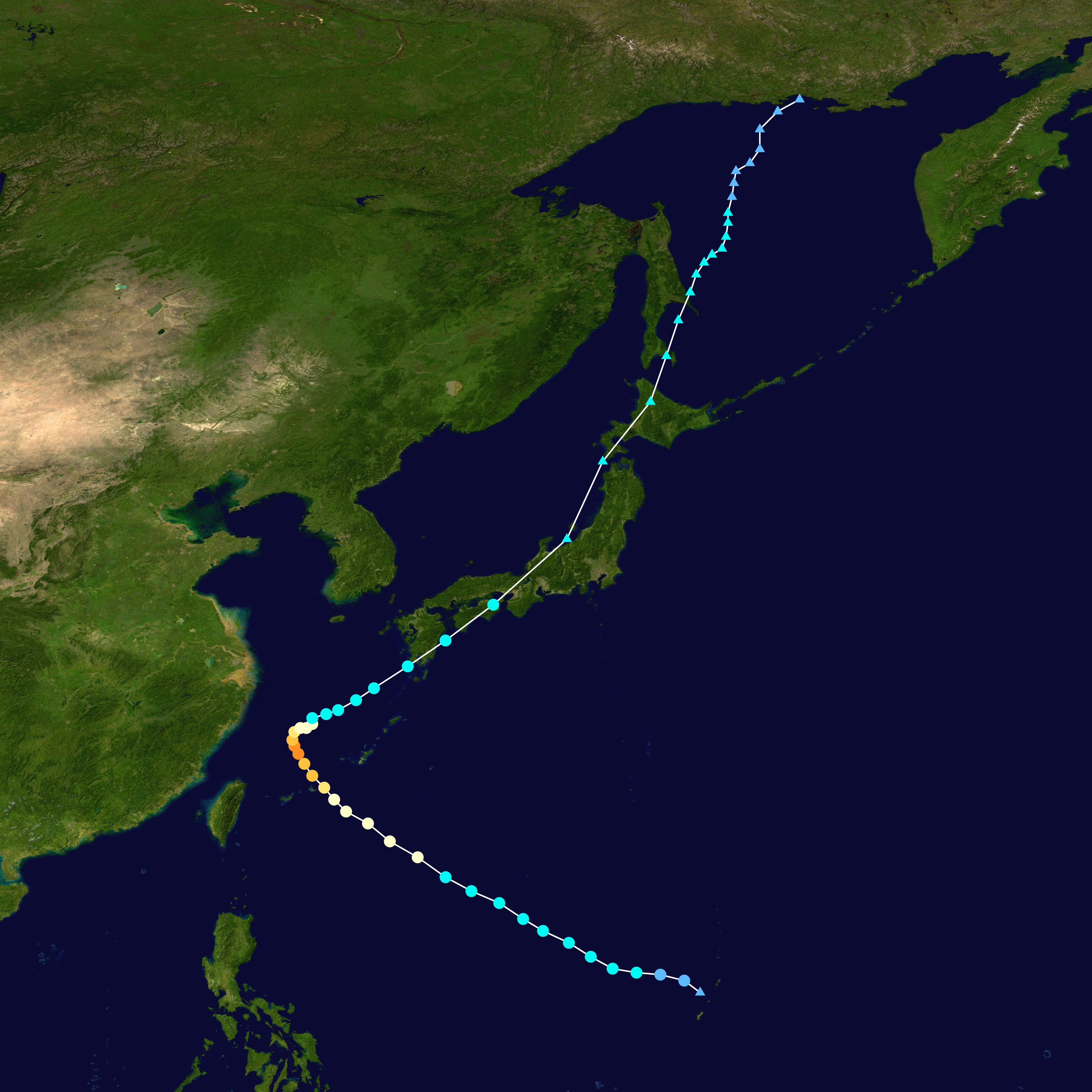
- Duration: September 8 – September 17
- Peak intensity: 175 km/h (110 mph) (10-min); 935 hPa (mbar)

A tropical depression formed east of Guam on September 7. By the next day, the JTWC began issuing advisories on Tropical Depression 20W. On September 9, 20W organized into a tropical storm, with the JMA naming the system as Talim. With gradual intensification, the JMA upgraded Talim to a severe tropical storm. Talim further strengthened to a typhoon on September 11 where it simultaneously entered the PAR, with PAGASA naming it as Lannie. The JTWC, however, delayed their upgrade until September 12. Due to an ill-defined eye, Talim maintained its intensity until its eye became much clearer as rapid deepening ensued, as Talim became a Category 4 on September 14, and reached its peak intensity with 1-minute sustained winds of 220 km/h (135 mph). Talim began to curve eastward as it rapidly weakened to a tropical storm thereafter, making landfall in Kyushu on September 17, with a path of heavy rainfall up to the region east of Tokyo.

In Japan, 5 people were killed, and the agricultural loss were about JP¥32 billion (US$287.9 million). Total damages across the country were counted to be US$750 million.

=== Typhoon Doksuri (Maring) ===
- Typhoon (JMA)
- Category 2 typhoon (SSHWS)
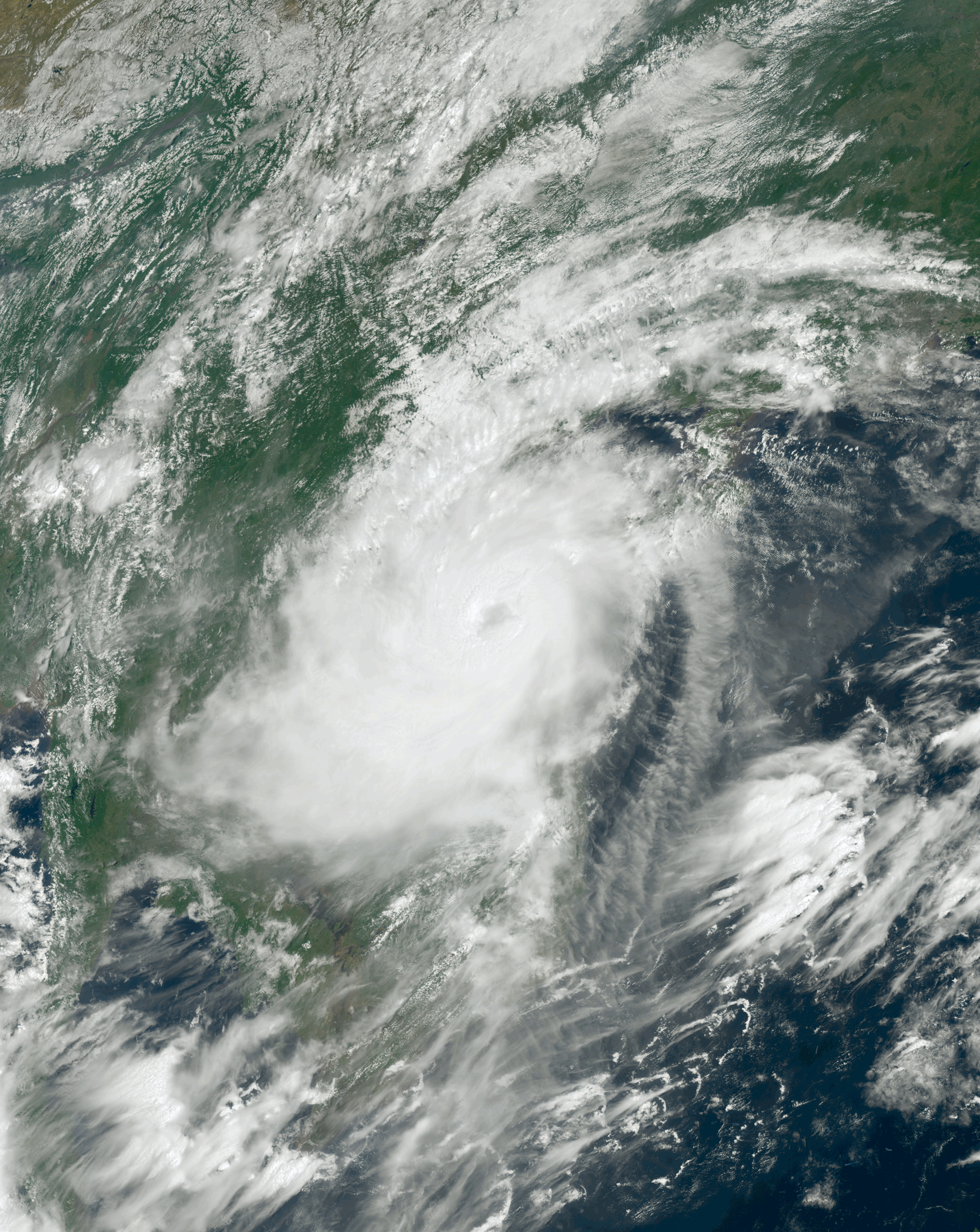
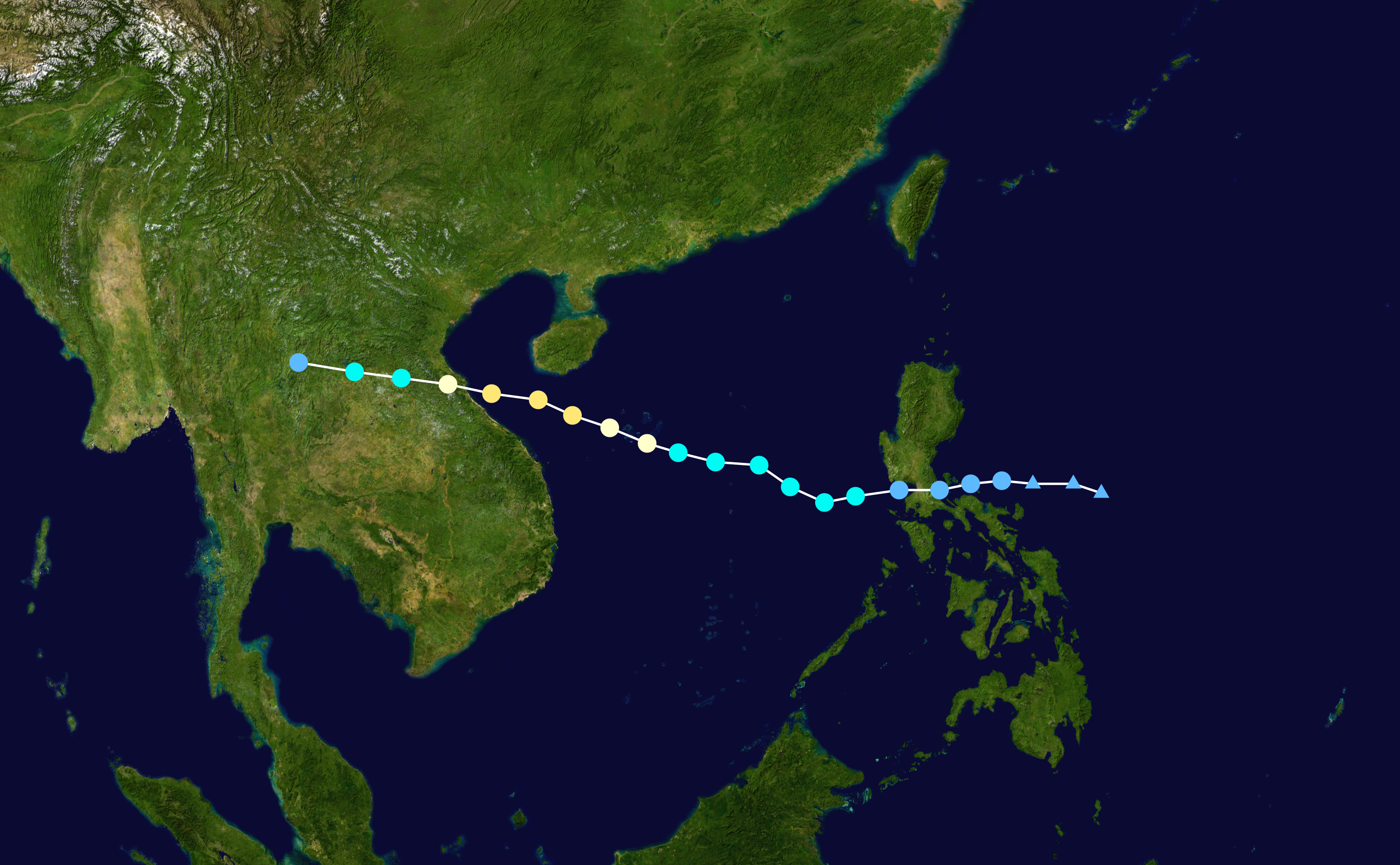
- Duration: September 10 – September 16
- Peak intensity: 150 km/h (90 mph) (10-min); 955 hPa (mbar)

On September 9, the Joint Typhoon Warning Center (JTWC) began monitoring on a tropical disturbance that had developed about 836 km (519 mi) west-northwest of the province of Eastern Samar. During the next day, the Japan Meteorological Agency (JMA) classified the system as a weak tropical depression. As the tropical cyclone is inside PAR, it was assigned the name "Maring". On 21:00 UTC of September 11, the JTWC followed suit, giving the designation of 21W. The JMA upgraded 21W to a tropical storm during September 12, giving the name Doksuri, the 19th named storm of the annual typhoon season.

Laguna was one of the provinces that got hit hard by the storm as the city was placed under a state of calamity after it had "too much rainfall" that produced further flash floods and landslides.

As of September 19, the NDRRMC confirmed a total of 8 dead due to landslides and flooding while total damages were up to ₱267 million (US$5.24 million).

On September 15, Typhoon Doksuri made landfall in Quảng Bình Province, Vietnam as a Category 3 typhoon. On the mainland of Vietnam, at the meteorological stations in Hoành Sơn and Kỳ Anh (Hà Tĩnh), sustained wind speeds of 115 km/h (72 mph) were recorded, and wind gusts at the Hoành Sơn station were recorded in the range of 151–155 km/h (94–96 mph). The lowest atmospheric pressure recorded in Ba Đồn (Quảng Bình) during the typhoon's impact was 966.6 hPa (28.54 inHg) at 11:15 ICT on September 15. Doksuri killed 15 people so far in Vietnam while estimated damages were about ₫16.36 trillion (US$720 million). Despite making landfall in Indochina, Doksuri affected Hainan and total economic losses were estimated to be CNY 100 million (US$15.3 million).

=== Tropical Depression 22W (Nando) ===
- Tropical depression (JMA)
- Tropical depression (SSHWS)
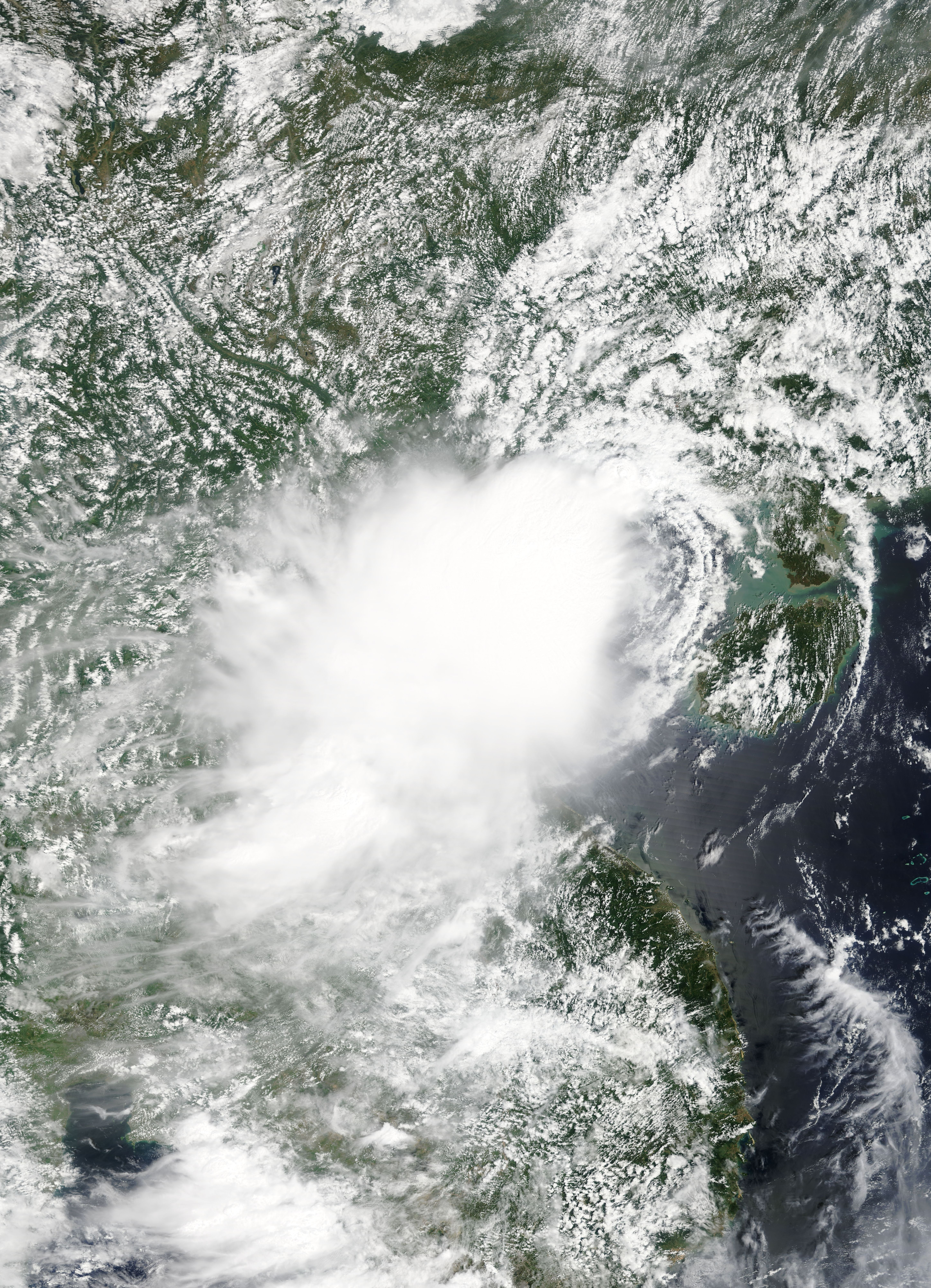
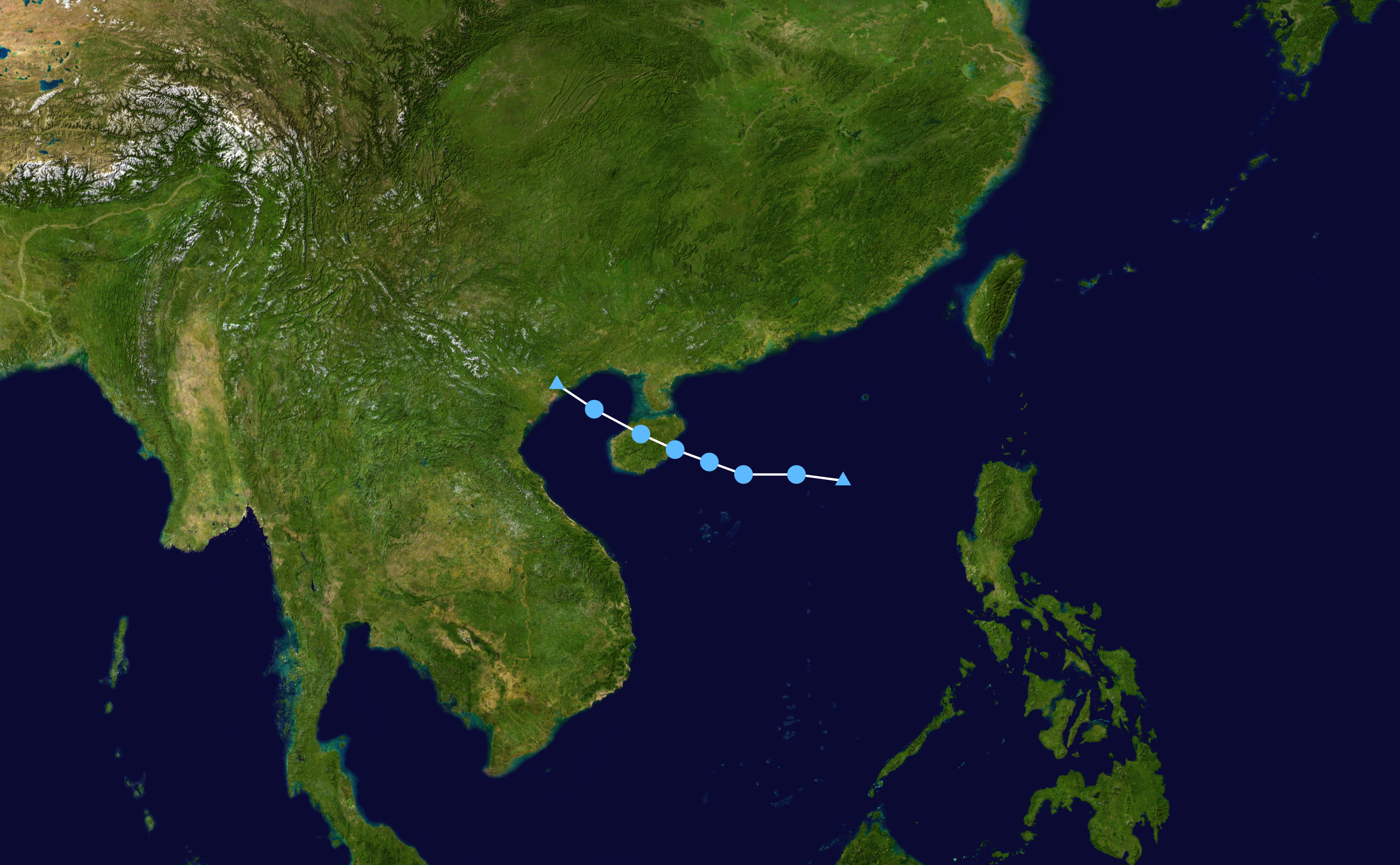
- Duration: September 23 – September 25
- Peak intensity: 55 km/h (35 mph) (10-min); 1000 hPa (mbar)

A tropical depression formed to the west of Luzon on September 23, and was named "Nando" by PAGASA. The tropical depression quickly moved west-northwest and made landfall in Quảng Ninh, Vietnam, on September 25, before dissipating later on the same day.

The China Observatory issued a "yellow" alert over in the eastern and southern regions due to rainstorms. Some areas have warned a possible precipitation of about 140 millimetres (5.5 in). Typhoon Signal No. 1 was raised over in Hong Kong during September 24, with expected gusts of up to 70 km/h (45 mph) including rough swells. A voltage dip also occurred, causing 17 people to be trapped in lifts. As the depression approached Vietnam on September 25, the Vietnam National Center for Hydro-Meteorological Forecasting of Vietnam forecast rainfall of about 150 millimetres (5.9 in) in Hanoi and surrounding provinces, with rough waves up to 3 m (9.8 ft) in Hạ Long Bay.

=== Tropical Depression 23W ===
- Tropical depression (JMA)
- Tropical depression (SSHWS)
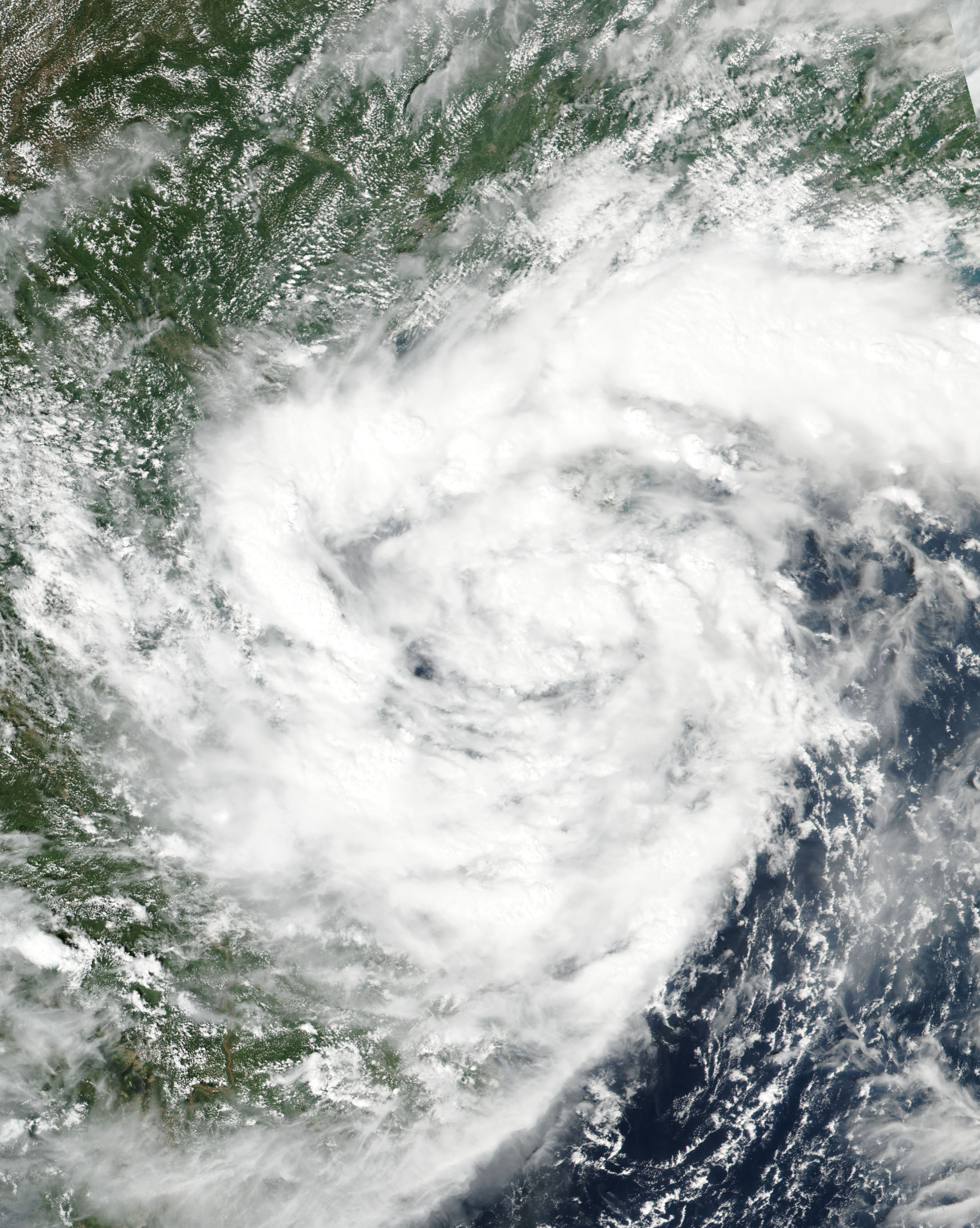
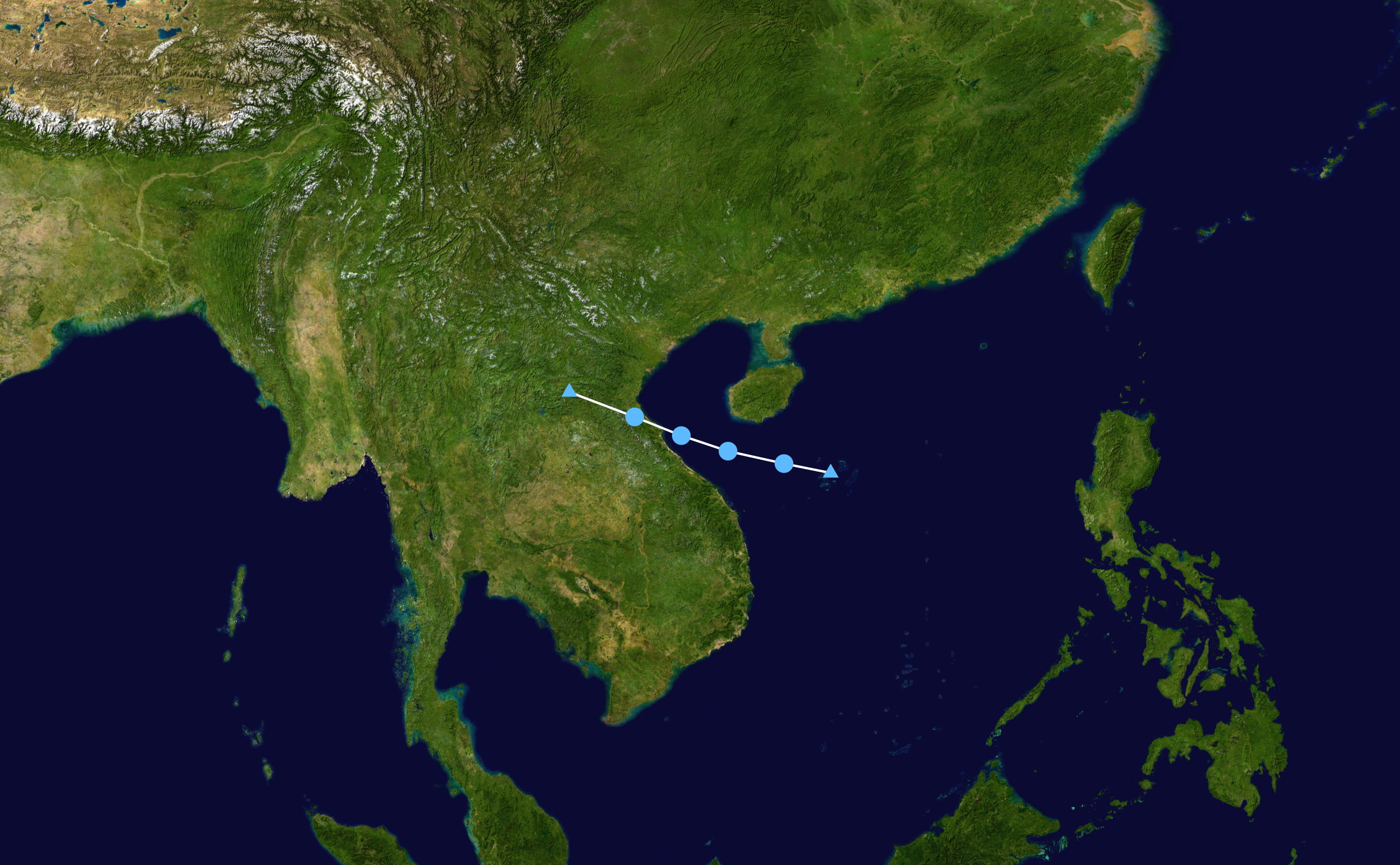
- Duration: October 7 – October 10
- Peak intensity: 55 km/h (35 mph) (10-min); 1000 hPa (mbar)

Early on October 7, a tropical depression formed to the west of the Philippines.

Early on October 10, the tropical depression made landfall in Hà Tĩnh Province, Vietnam, and dissipated shortly afterward. Consequently, both the JMA and the JTWC issued their final advisories for the storm.

Tropical Depression 23W caused severe flooding over provinces of Northern and Central Vietnam. Roughly more than 700 houses have been destroyed, while rescue efforts have saved 28 people from the danger zone. In total, 100 people were killed, and damages were about 13 trillion₫ (US$572 million). During October 10, the Red River was forecast to have waters exceed to the levels of 3–50 cm (1.2–19.7 in). In Hoàng Long river (Ninh Bình Province) flooding was the most severe since 1985.

=== Typhoon Khanun (Odette) ===
- Typhoon (JMA)
- Category 2 typhoon (SSHWS)
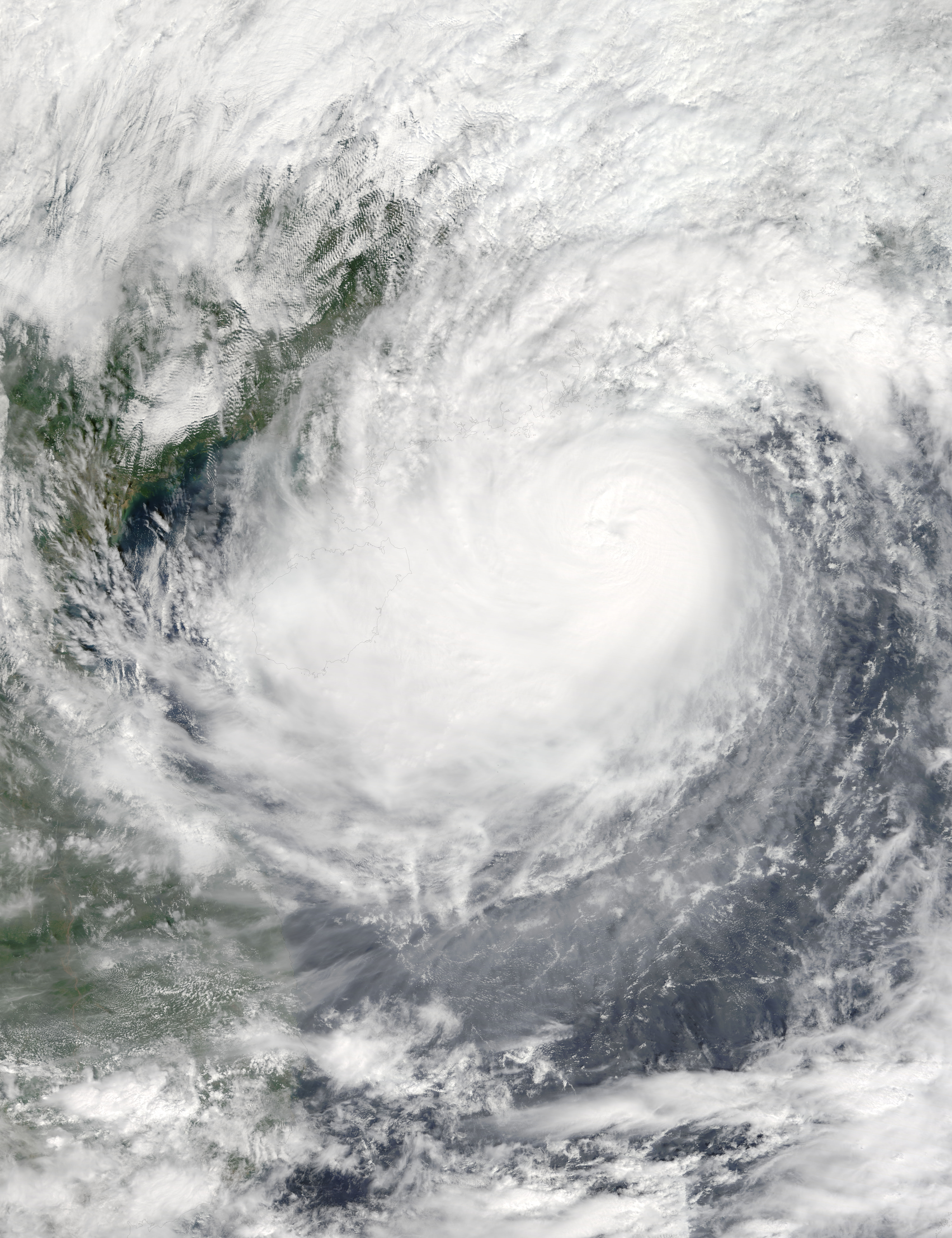
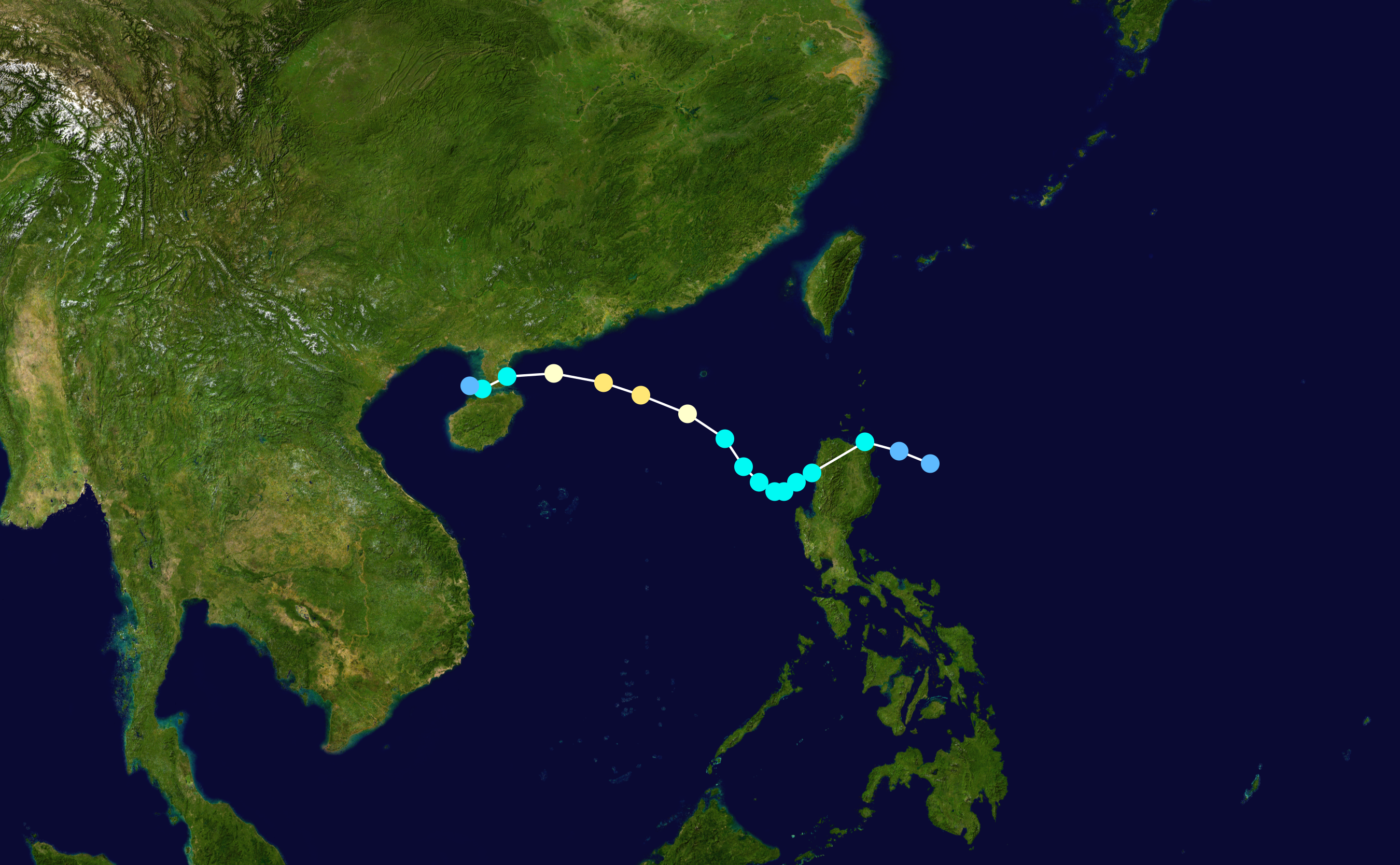
- Duration: October 11 – October 16
- Peak intensity: 140 km/h (85 mph) (10-min); 955 hPa (mbar)

By October 11, the Japan Meteorological Agency upgraded a disturbance that was organizing in the Philippine Sea. By 06:00 UTC on the following day, the Joint Typhoon Warning Center also upgraded the disturbance to a depression, designating it as "24W". By 12:00 UTC the same day, the JMA officially upgraded the depression, naming it as "Khanun". Two hours later, the PAGASA upgraded the depression, naming it "Odette". Over the rest of the day, Khanun intensified under favorable conditions, while approaching the northern parts of Luzon. At 14:00 UTC (10:00 pm PHST), PAGASA upgraded "Odette" to a tropical storm while nearing landfall over Santa Ana, Cagayan. The storm will make landfall on the place, and emerged into the South China Sea, when it started re-intensifying under favorable conditions. At 06:00 UTC, JMA upgraded Khanun into a severe tropical storm; the PAGASA would later follow suit, as "Odette" is also upgraded into a severe tropical storm. At 14:00 UTC (10:00 pm PHST), PAGASA reported that Severe Tropical Storm "Odette" has exited their Philippine Area of Responsibility.

Intensifying in the South China Sea, Khanun was upgraded to a typhoon by the JMA on October 14 at 12:00 UTC. The JTWC would follow suit six hours later, upgrading the storm into a category 1 typhoon. By the next day, JMA reported that Khanun reached its peak intensity with 135 km/h (75 knots) and a pressure of 955 hPa. The JTWC would follow suit three hours later with the winds of 165 km/h (90 knots) and a pressure of 965 hPa. After its peak, Khanun immediately weakened under the influence of the northeast monsoon; at the time the storm made landfall over the Leizhou Peninsula, the system was barely at tropical storm intensity. Both agencies would issue their last advisories on Khanun, as the storm weakened further while approaching the northern Vietnam.

According to the NDRRMC, Khanun killed one person, with total damages of ₱4.45 million (US$86,600). Authorities in Hong Kong and Macau raised the number 8 tropical cyclone warning on October 15 as gale-force winds affected the region. In total, damages from Khanun in South China were counted to be CNY2.46 billion (US$373 million).

=== Typhoon Lan (Paolo) ===
- Very strong typhoon (JMA)
- Category 4 super typhoon (SSHWS)
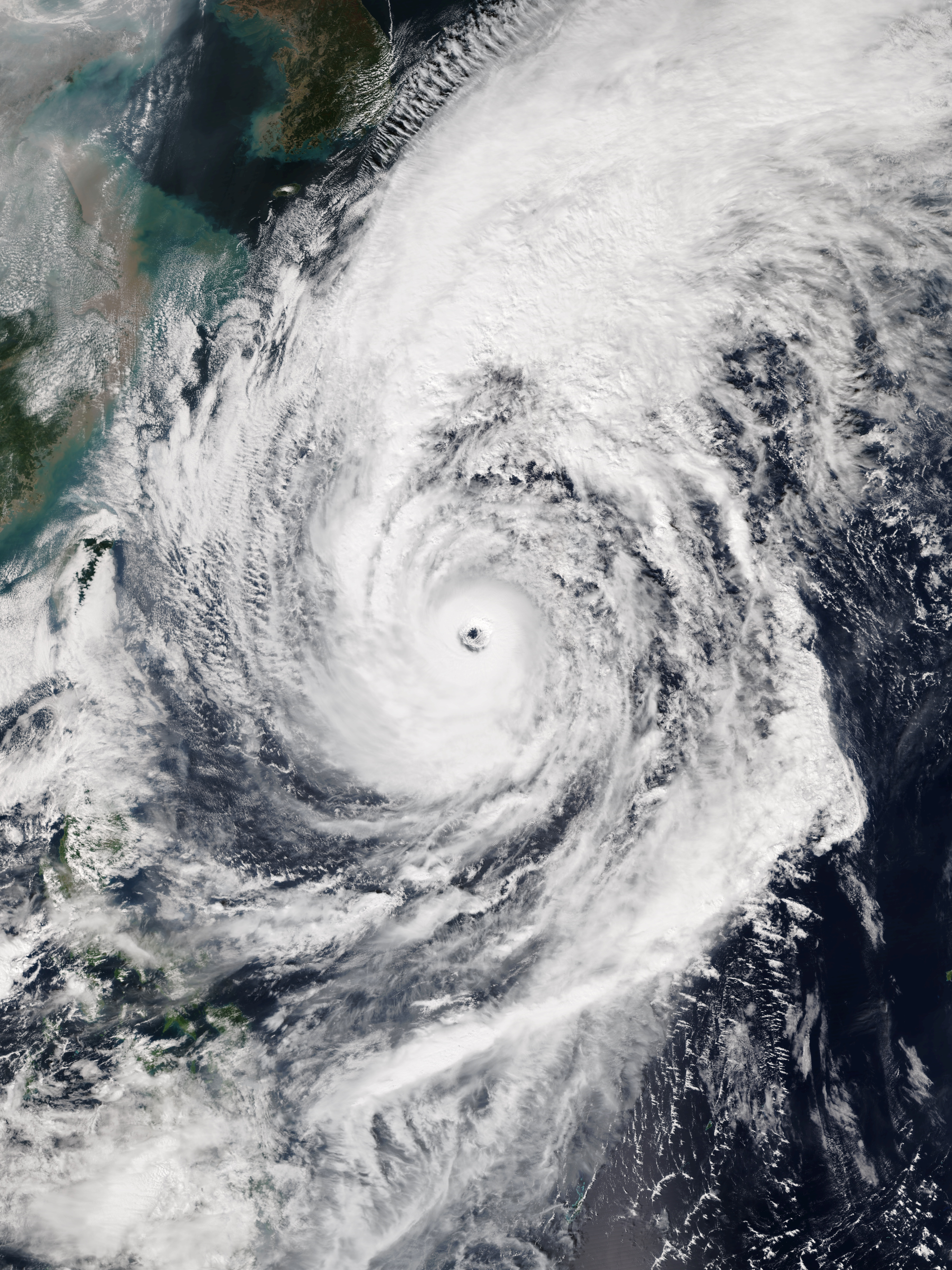
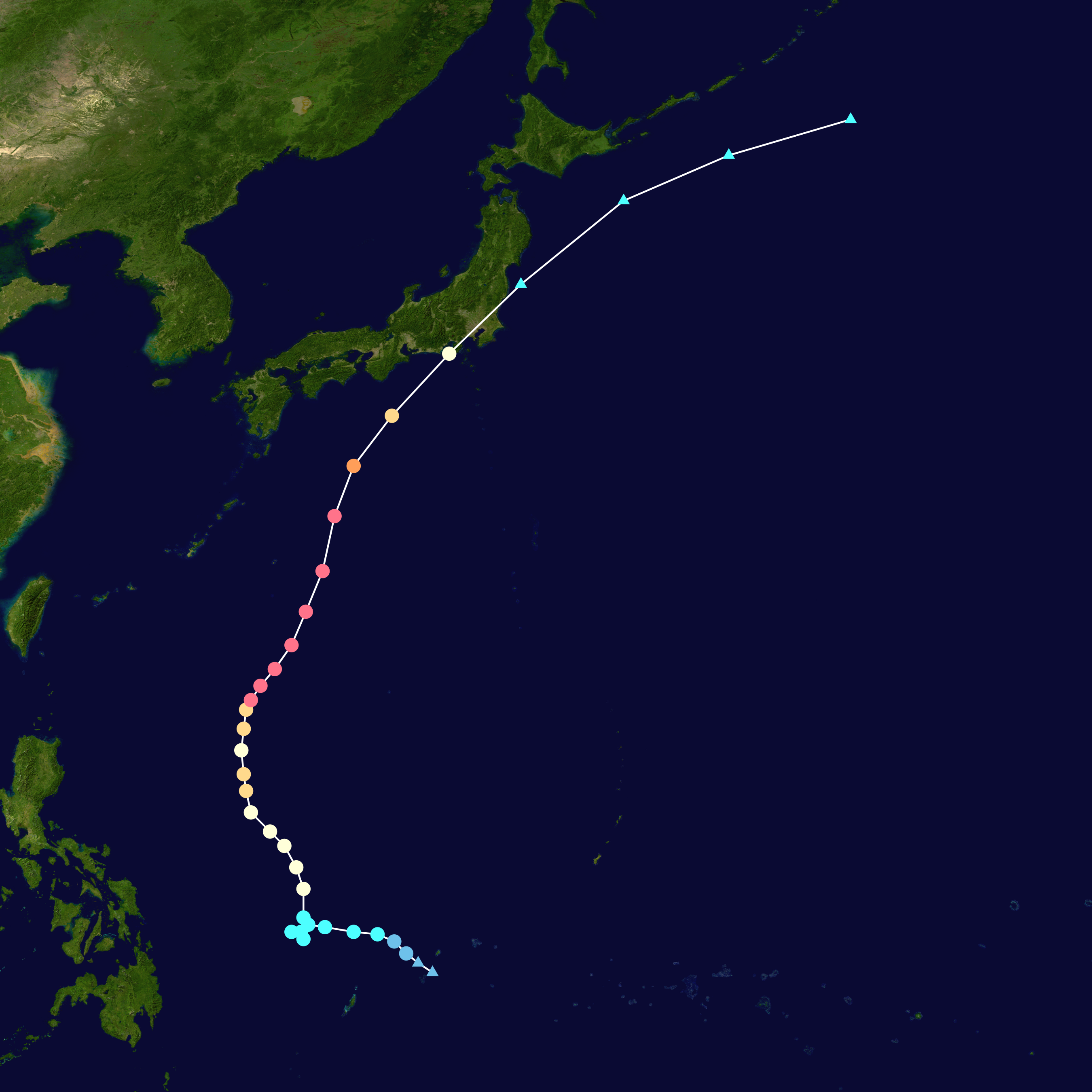
- Duration: October 15 – October 23
- Peak intensity: 185 km/h (115 mph) (10-min); 915 hPa (mbar)

The United States Naval Research Laboratory (NRL) initially mentioned a tropical disturbance over Chuuk on October 11. After the slow consolidation, the Joint Typhoon Warning Center (JTWC) issued a Tropical Cyclone Formation Alert to the elongated system early on October 14, shortly after the Japan Meteorological Agency (JMA) started to monitor it as a low-pressure area. The agency upgraded it to a tropical depression almost one day later and began to issue tropical cyclone warnings since 06:00 UTC on October 15. In the afternoon, the JTWC also upgraded it to a tropical depression assigning the designation 25W, which formative but shallow convective bands had become more organized, and symmetrically wrapped into a defined low-level circulation center. About three hours later, the JMA upgraded it to the twenty-first Northwest Pacific tropical storm in 2017 and assigned the international name Lan, when it was located approximately 310 km (190 mi) to the northeast of Palau. Early on October 16, the JTWC upgraded Lan to a tropical storm too, based on T-number 2.5 of the Dvorak technique, shortly before it entered the Philippine Area of Responsibility and received the name Paolo from PAGASA.

In Japan, 17 people were killed in Mainland Japan and the agricultural loss were about JP¥62.19 billion (US$547.9 million). Total economic losses were counted to be US$2 billion.

=== Tropical Depression 26W ===
- Tropical depression (SSHWS)
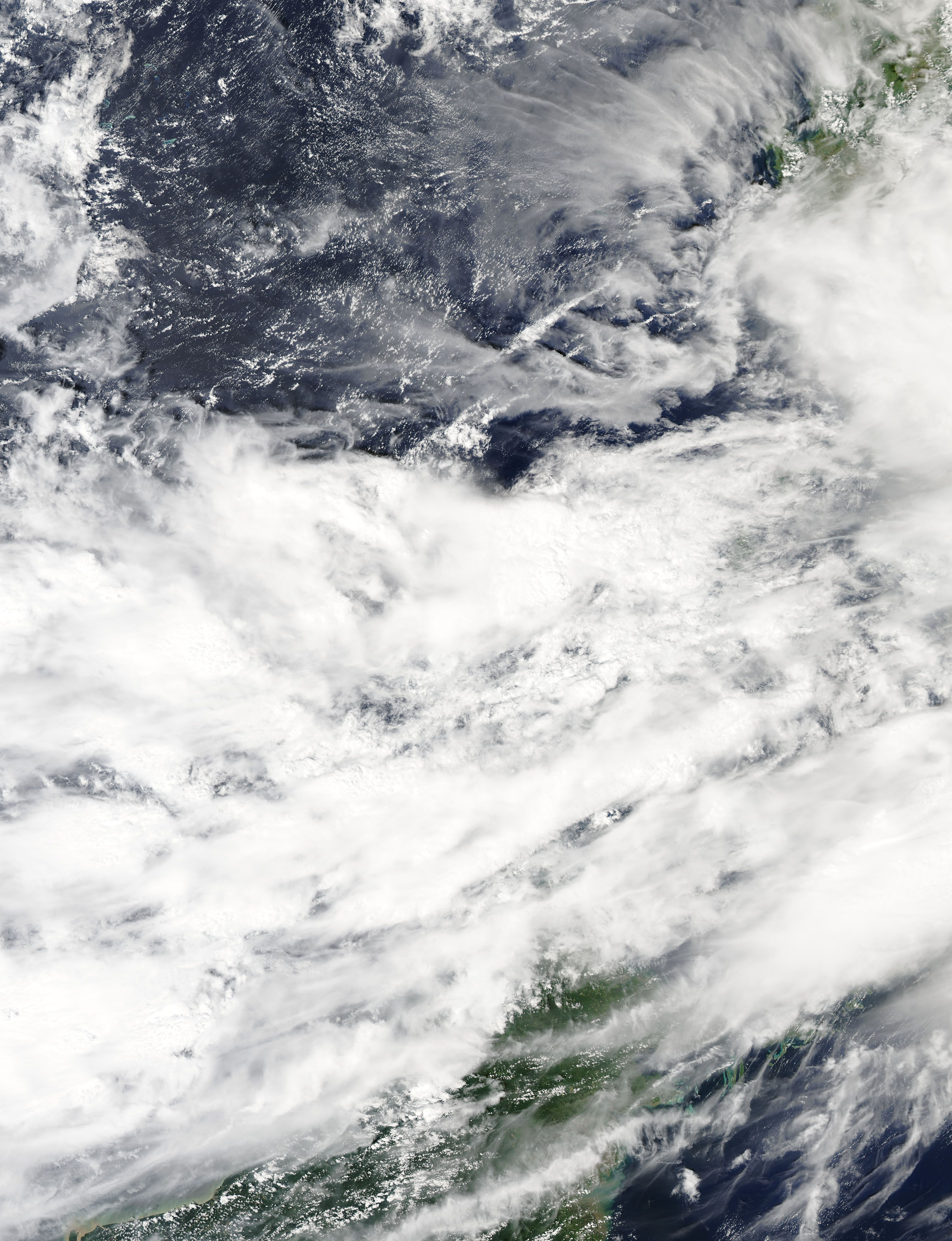
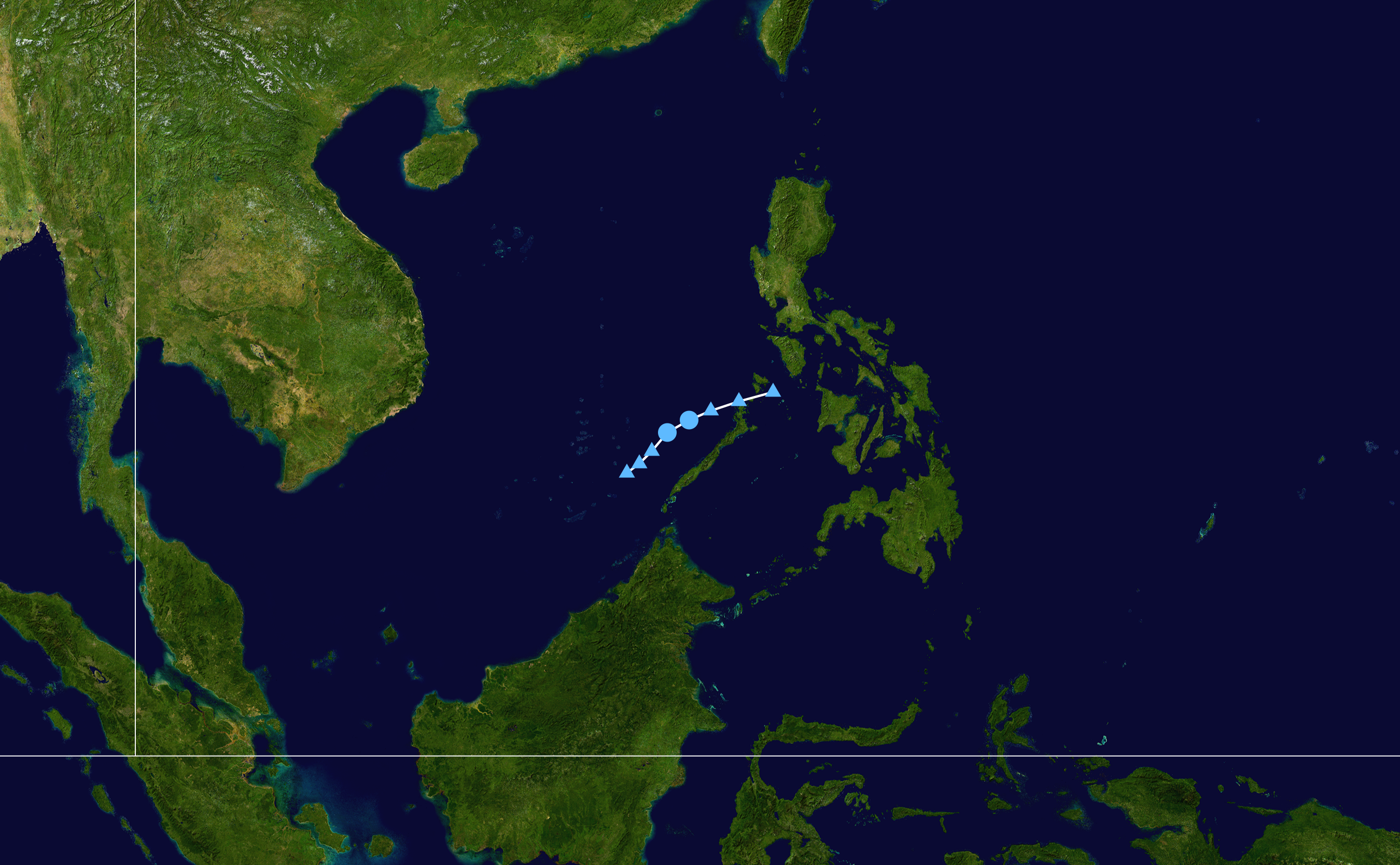
- Duration: October 18 – October 19
- Peak intensity: 45 km/h (30 mph) (1-min); 1002 hPa (mbar)

Originating from an enhanced monsoon trough, a tropical disturbance developed just to the northwest of Palawan on October 17. On October 18, the JTWC had issued a TCFA on the system. By 21:00 UTC of that day, the JTWC began issuing advisories as they classified it as a tropical depression, assigning the identifier 26W. This was due to deep convection found near the storm's center with formative banding, along with its location over in a favorable environment. Initially, its forecast stated that 26W would intensify into a weak tropical storm, although due to a disorganized center with strong shear, the JTWC issued their final advisory on October 19 as it was being absorbed by the outflow of nearby Typhoon Lan.

Associated with the rainbands of a nearby typhoon, 26W helped spread scattered rainfall throughout most of Visayas and northern Mindanao. Residents in some areas were alerted against possible flash floods and landslides. 14 people were dead from heavy rainfall from the system and its precursor, and raised a state of calamity in Zamboanga City on October 23.

=== Severe Tropical Storm Saola (Quedan) ===
- Severe tropical storm (JMA)
- Category 1 typhoon (SSHWS)
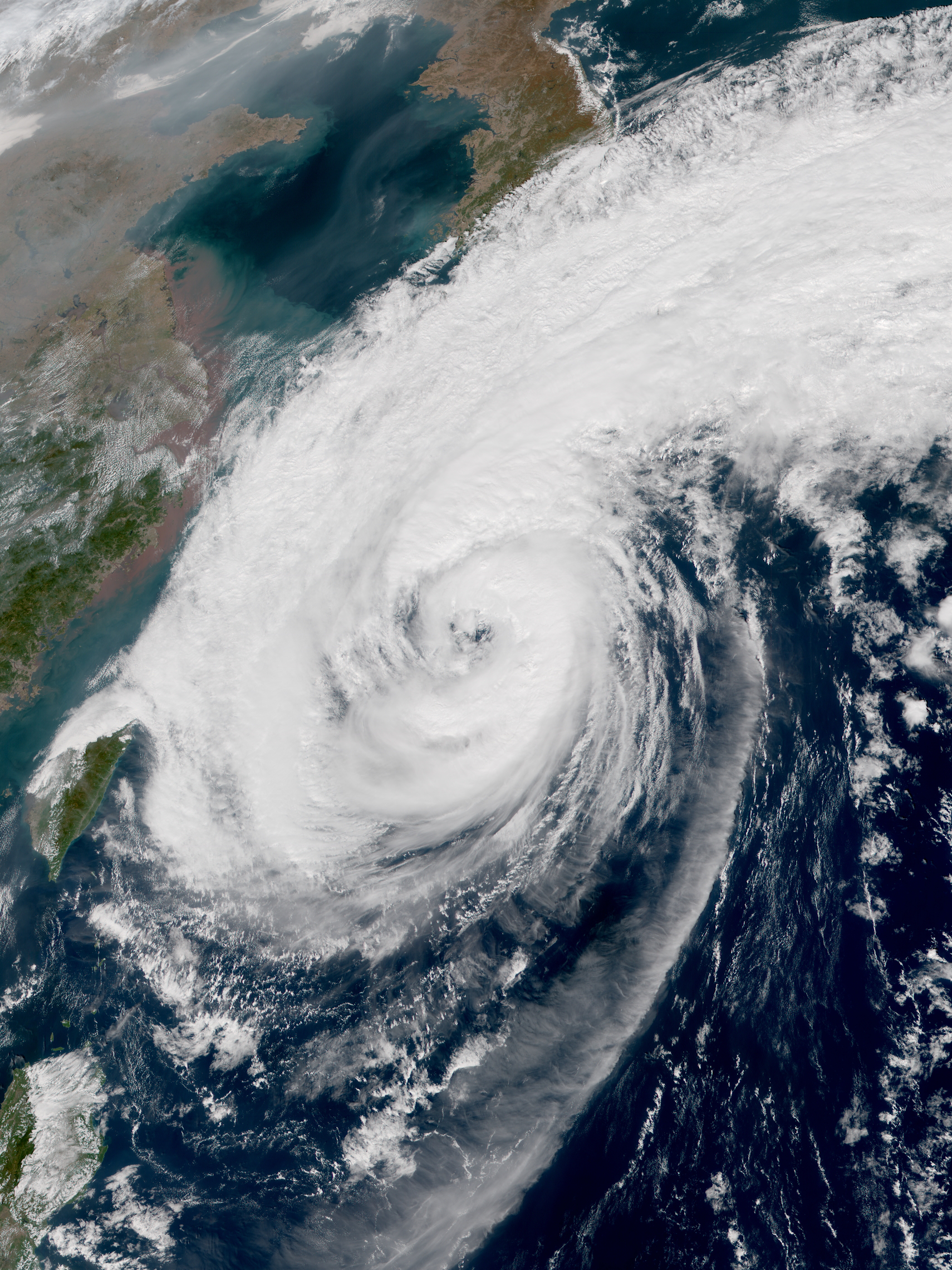
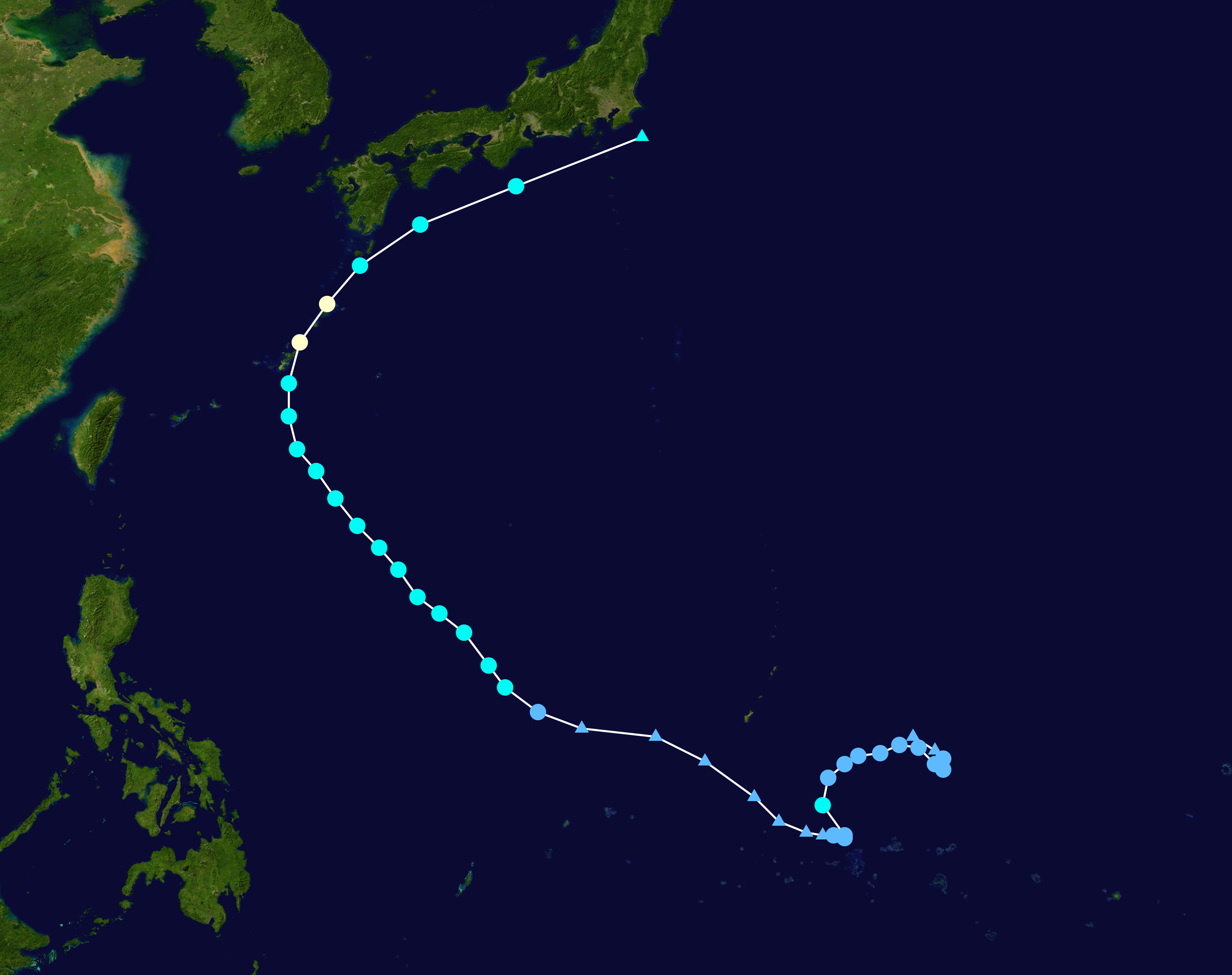
- Duration: October 22 – October 29
- Peak intensity: 110 km/h (70 mph) (10-min); 975 hPa (mbar)

A tropical depression developed north of Guam in late October 2017. Within a day, the system intensified and was upgraded to a tropical storm by the Japan Meteorological Agency (JMA), receiving the international name Saola. Later that evening, Saola entered the Philippine Area of Responsibility (PAR), prompting the Philippine Atmospheric, Geophysical and Astronomical Services Administration (PAGASA) to assign it the local name Quedan. On October 26, Saola strengthened into a severe tropical storm at approximately 08:00 UTC while moving slowly in a northwestward direction. Despite encountering moderate to strong vertical wind shear and interacting with the intensifying northeast monsoon, Saola maintained its intensity. It gradually curved northeastward, continuing to move in the general direction of Japan. The storm exited the Philippine Area of Responsibility on October 28, without making landfall in the country. As Saola progressed northeastward, it affected several islands within the Ryukyu Archipelago, making multiple landfalls and close approaches. Although it began to weaken upon encountering cooler sea surface temperatures and an increasingly hostile environment aloft, it still brought moderate to heavy rainfall and gusty winds to parts of southern Japan. The system did not make direct landfall on the Japanese mainland but caused localized flooding and transport disruptions due to persistent rainfall and rough seas. Eventually, Saola transitioned into an extratropical cyclone as it approached Chiba Prefecture, before dissipating shortly thereafter.

Although Saola did not make landfall as a tropical cyclone, the storm caused widespread effects in its path. The total damage was estimated at US$250 million, primarily from infrastructure damage, agricultural losses, and flooding impacts in the Ryukyu Islands and parts of southern Japan.

=== Tropical Depression 29W ===
- Tropical depression (JMA)
- Tropical depression (SSHWS)
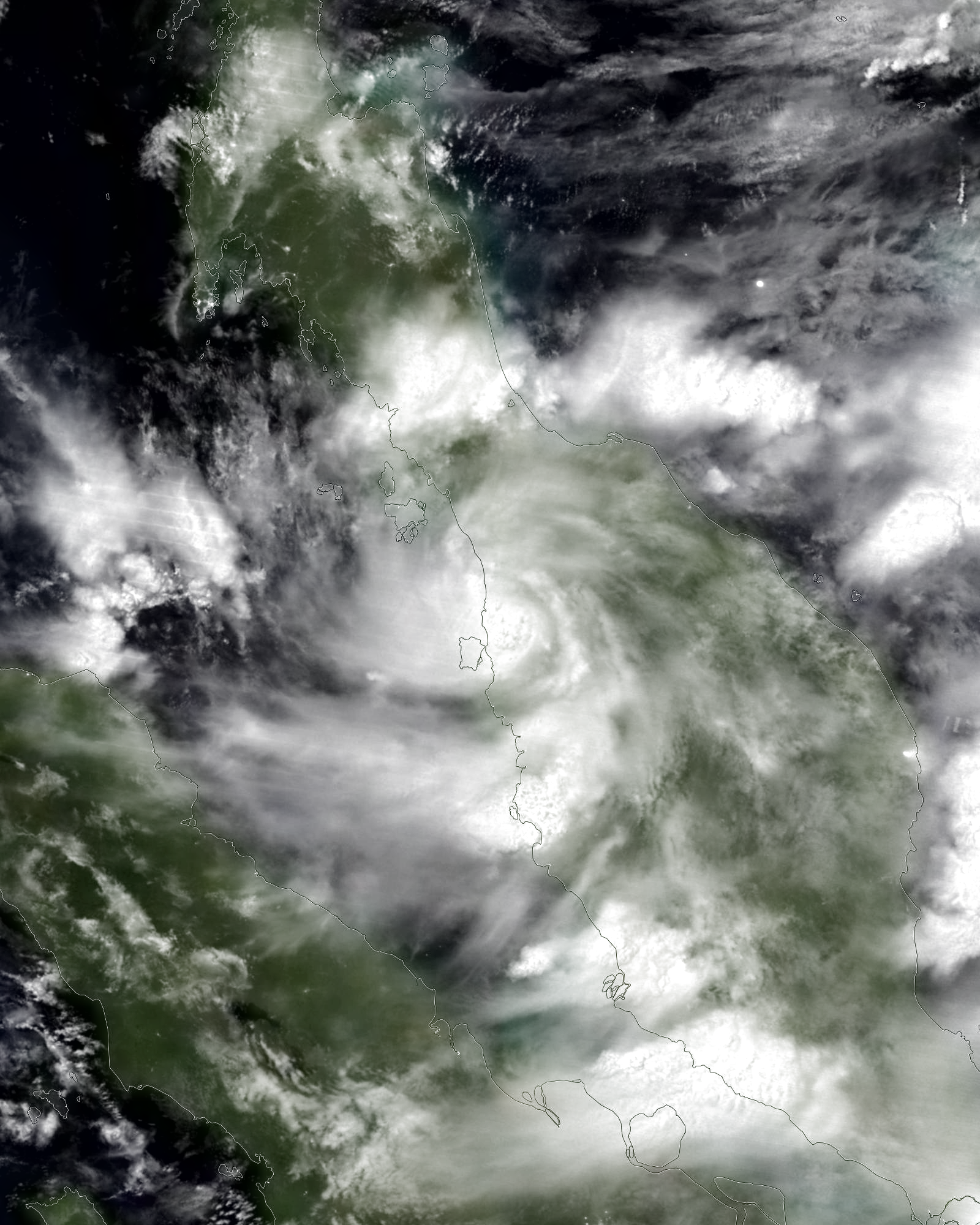
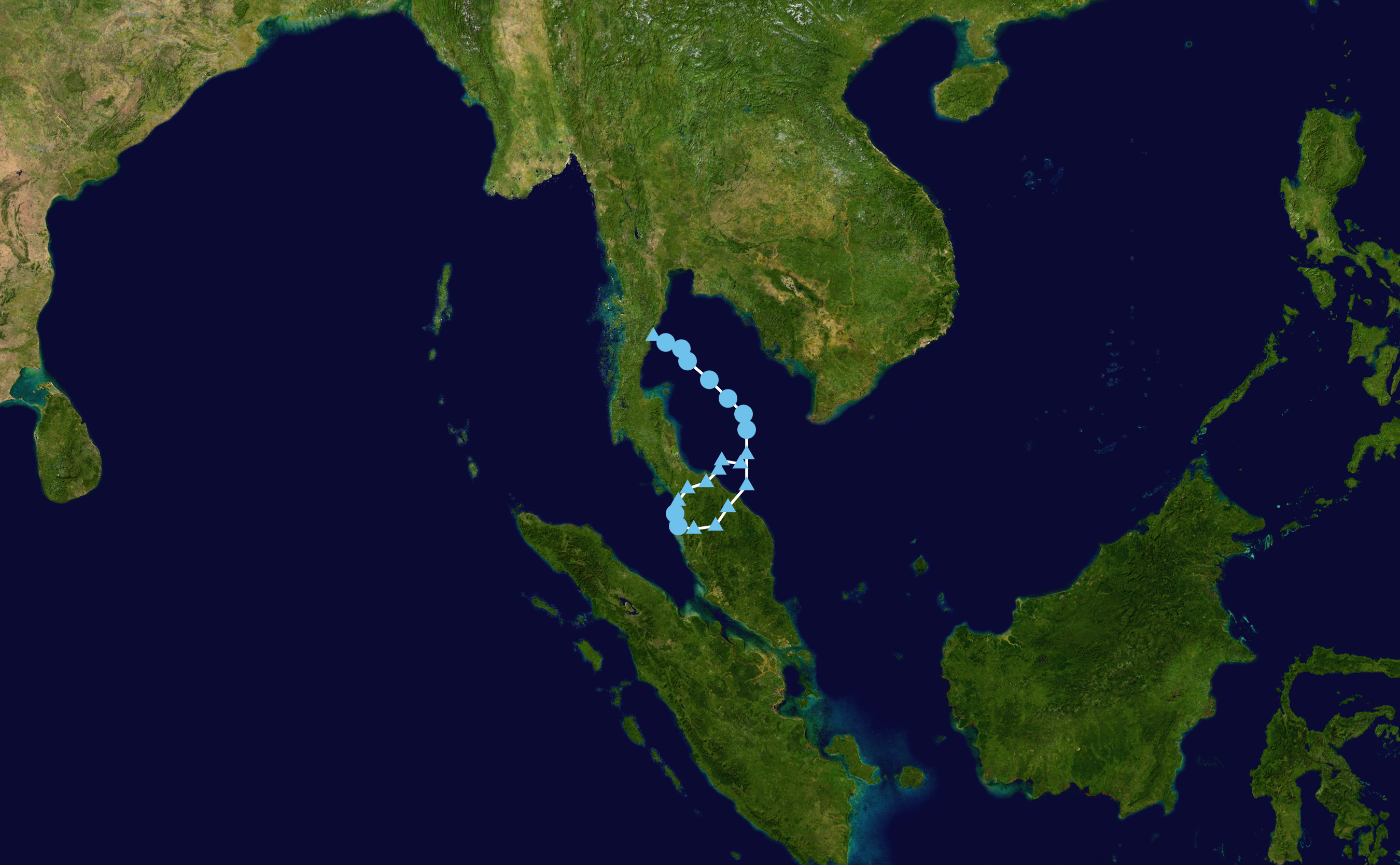
- Duration: October 30 – November 7
- Peak intensity: 55 km/h (35 mph) (10-min); 1004 hPa (mbar)

The JMA upgraded a low-pressure area to a tropical depression over the southern portion of the South China Sea, on October 30. The JTWC issued a TCFA during the next day as it gathered strength. Initially forecast to intensify to a tropical storm, the system rapidly deteriorated and degenerated to a remnant low on November 3 as it tracked into the Gulf of Thailand. Over in the course of two days, after re-curving back to the gulf, the JTWC re-issued a TCFA. By November 6, the JTWC classified the system as Tropical Depression 29W. On November 8, 29W made landfall over the Malay Peninsula, before dissipating soon afterward.

Tropical Depression 29W caused unusually heavy rains and flash floods to occur in the Malaysian state of Penang, causing seven fatalities. Damage in Penang amounted to 328 million ringgit (US$76.3 million).

=== Typhoon Damrey (Ramil) ===
- Typhoon (JMA)
- Category 2 typhoon (SSHWS)
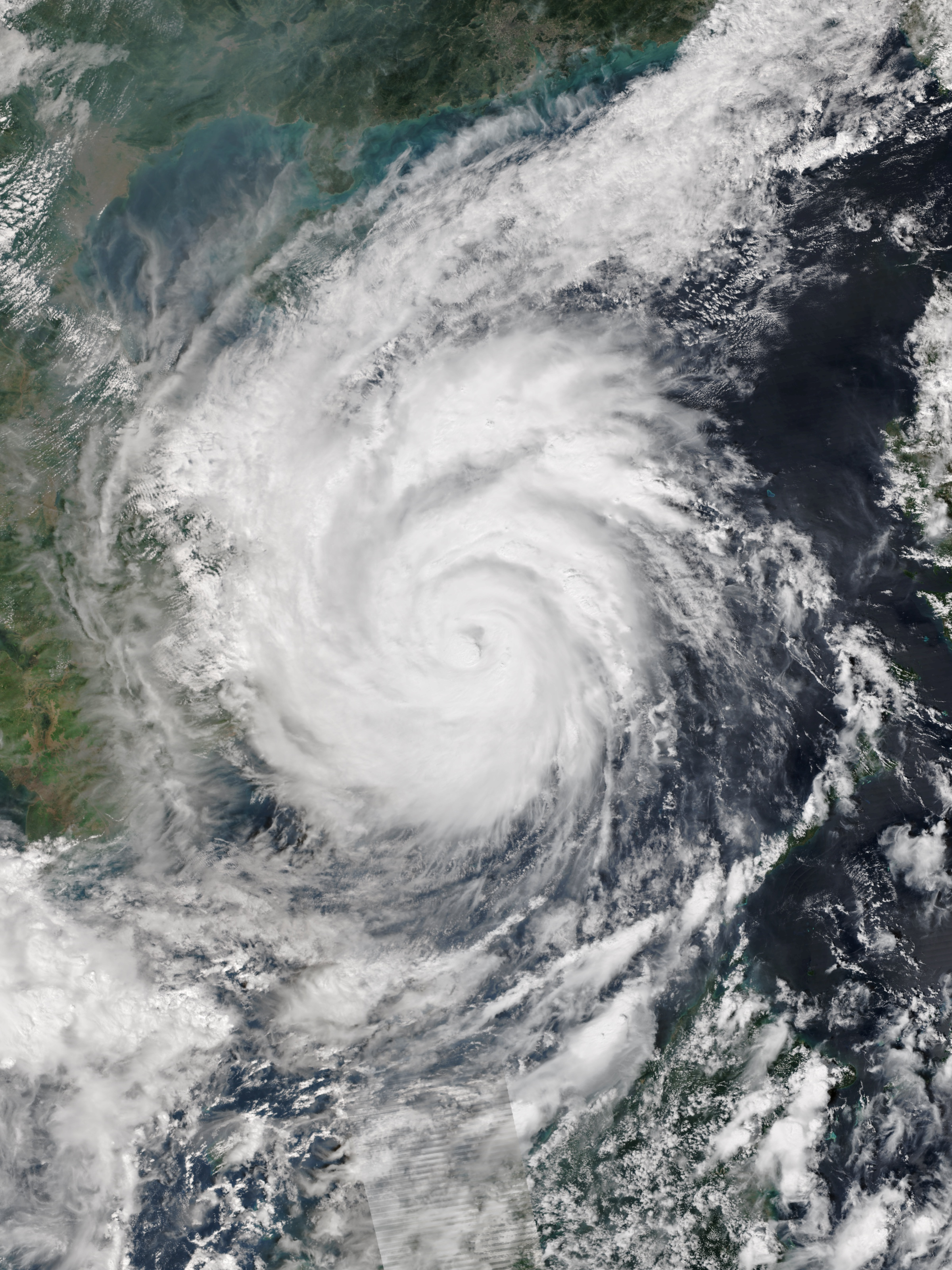
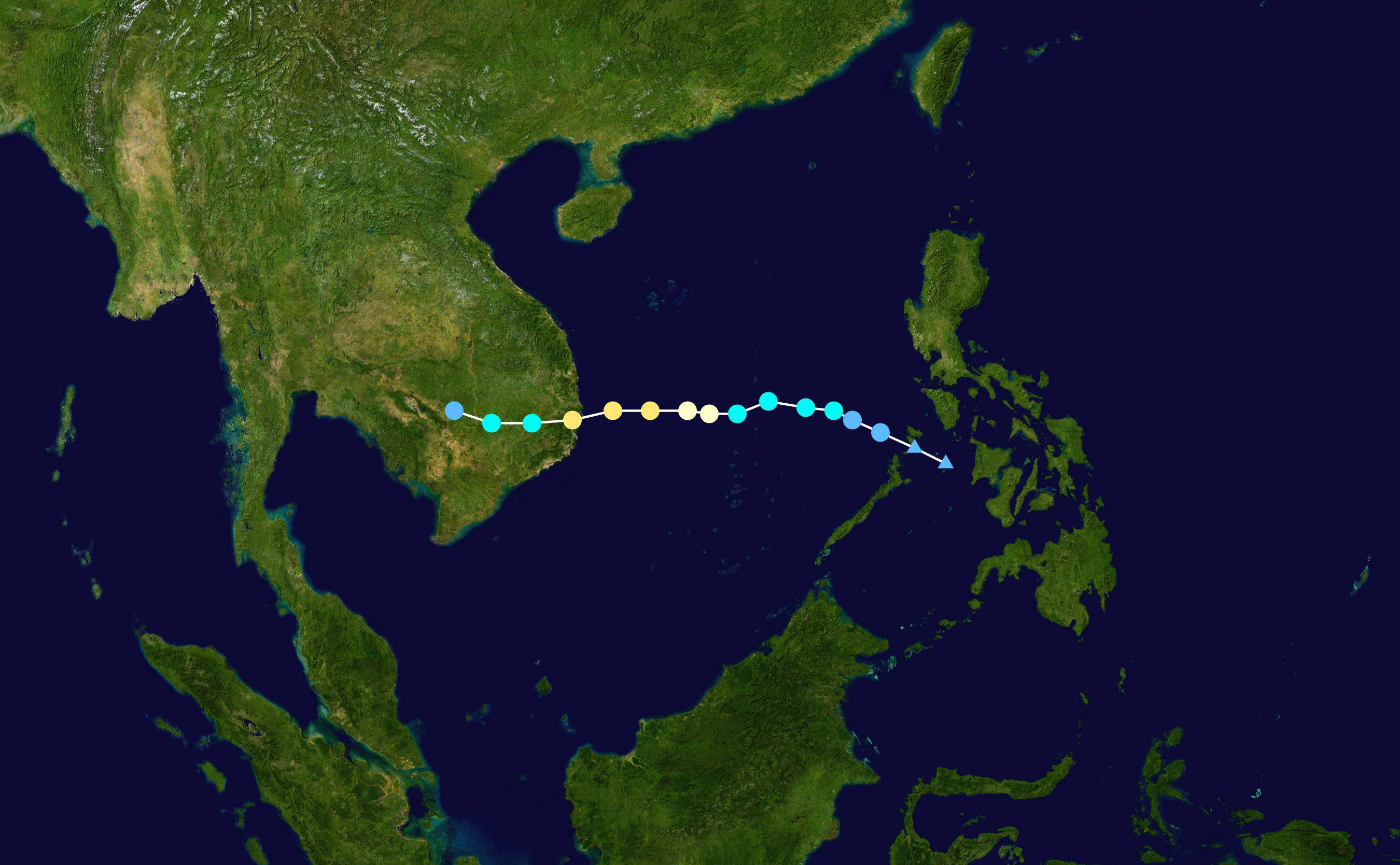
- Duration: October 31 – November 4
- Peak intensity: 130 km/h (80 mph) (10-min); 970 hPa (mbar)

The JMA upgraded a low-pressure area to a tropical depression east of Visayas on October 31. PAGASA gave warnings to the system and named it Ramil. The storm brought rainy weather on the All Saints's Day (November 1) to Visayas. The tropical depression made landfall over Busuanga, Palawan at midnight on November 1. On November 2, Ramil strengthened, and the JTWC and JMA upgraded Ramil to a tropical storm, and gave the system the international name Damrey.

Torrential rains caused by the storm resulted in 2.5 ft of deep flooding, damaging agricultural crops. Agricultural damages were totaled to Php1.03 million (US$20,000) over in the city of Aurora Quezon on November 4.

Strong winds, heavy rainfall and severe flooding in Central Vietnam caused by the typhoon. Total damage reached over 22 trillion VND (US$1 billion). Damrey made landfall in central Vietnam as the region hosted the 2017 APEC Summit in Da Nang.

As of November 8, a total of 112 people were confirmed dead due to the storm.

=== Tropical Storm Haikui (Salome) ===
- Tropical storm (JMA)
- Tropical storm (SSHWS)
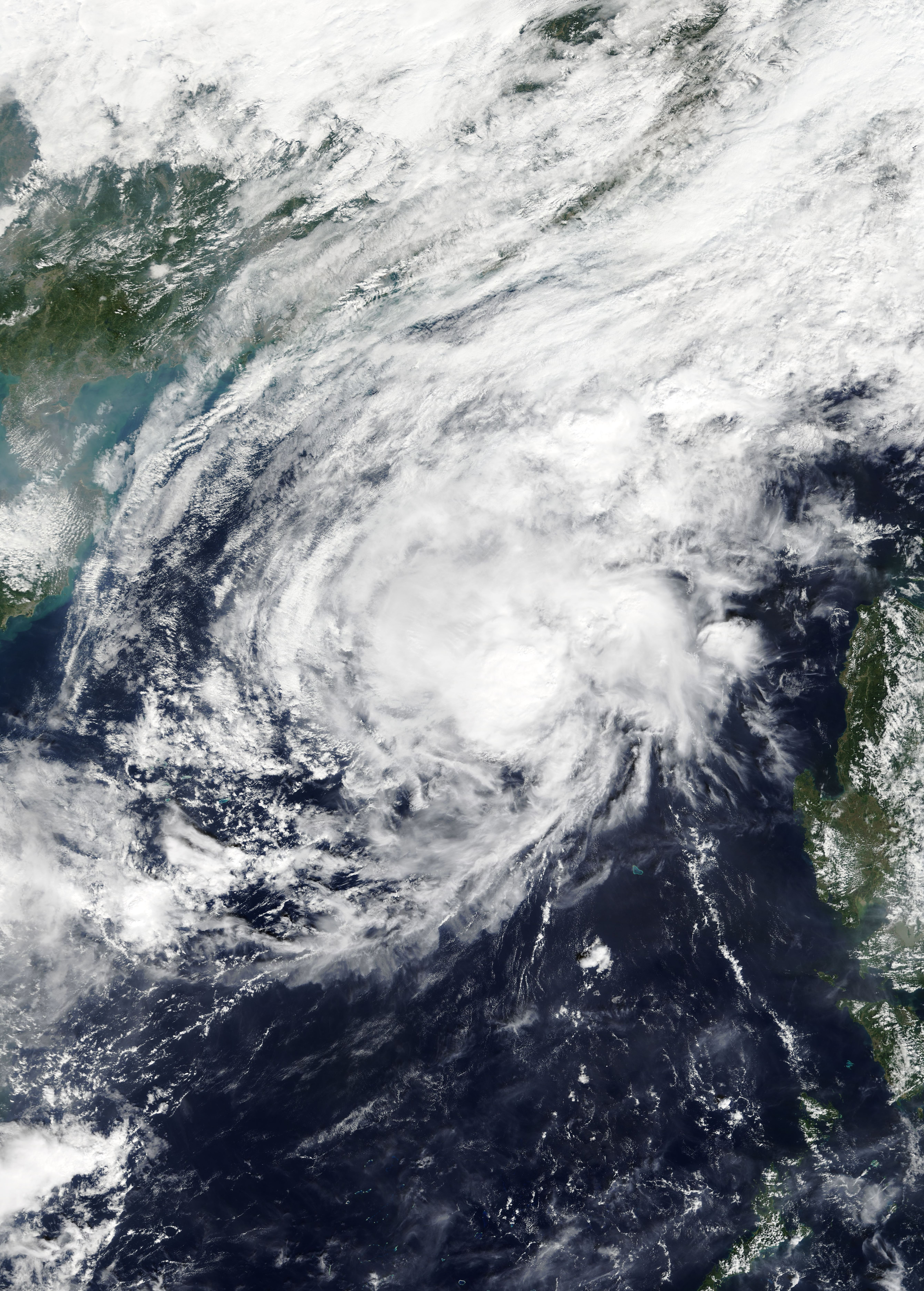
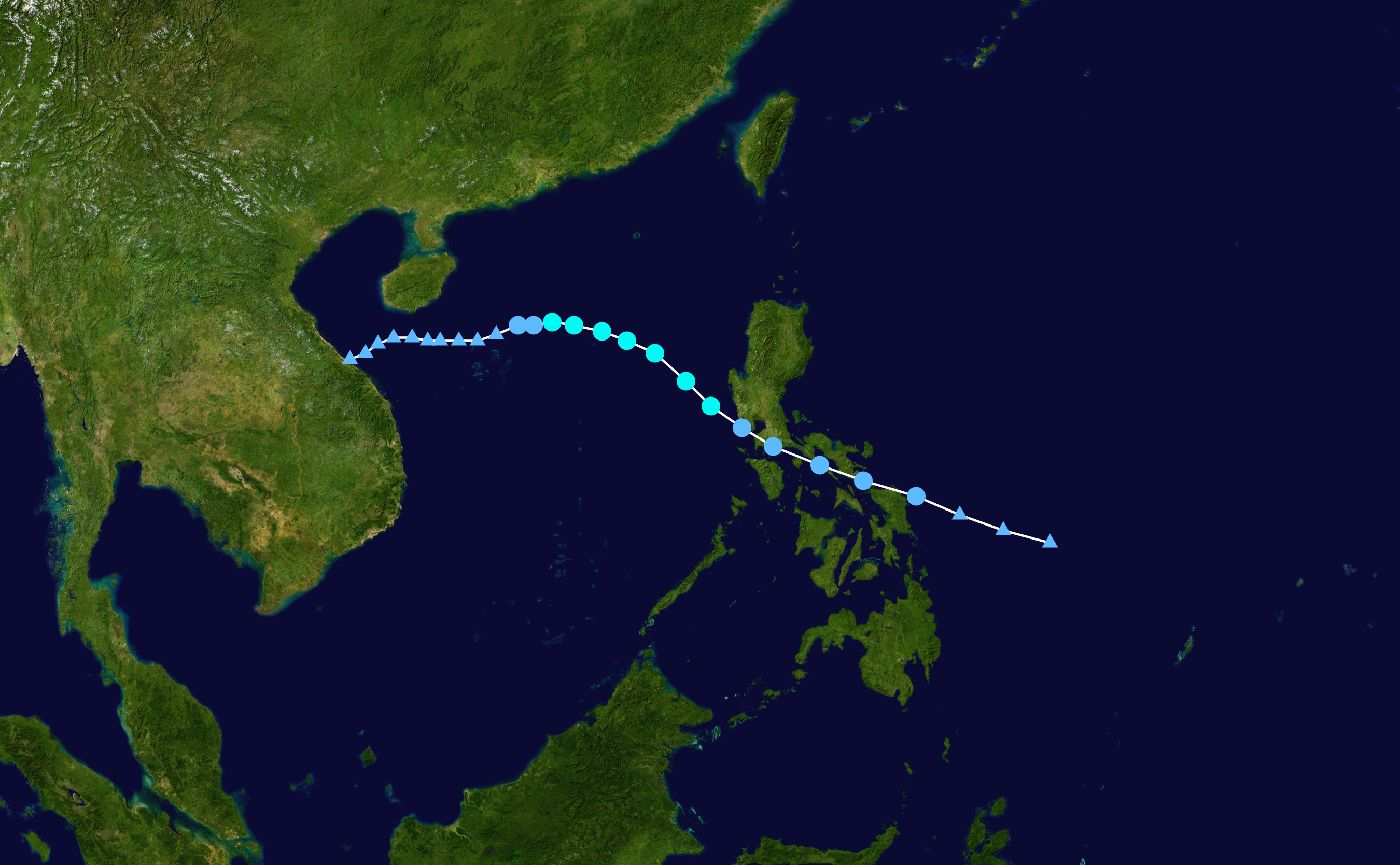
- Duration: November 7 – November 13
- Peak intensity: 75 km/h (45 mph) (10-min); 998 hPa (mbar)

A Tropical Depression formed over Samar on November 9, and PAGASA gave the name Salome to the system. Salome damaged boats in Sorsogon with large waves. On the next day, after Salome made landfall, the system intensified into a tropical storm, and the JMA gave the international name Haikui to the system. Haikui dropped heavy rainfall over Southern Luzon and Visayas. It landfalled in Batangas before midnight and passed the boundary of Batangas and Cavite at 11:00 in that evening. It dissipated on Vietnam on November 13, 2017.

In China, Haikui produced heavy, sustained rain in the island province of Hainan, China. Flooding was recorded in several locations on the east side of the province. In the capital Haikou, flooding caused road closure.

No casualties were reported, though damages were totaled up to ₱218.5 million (US$4.26 million). In addition, only five houses were fully damaged in Dipaculao, Aurora.

=== Tropical Storm Kirogi (Tino) ===
- Tropical storm (JMA)
- Tropical storm (SSHWS)
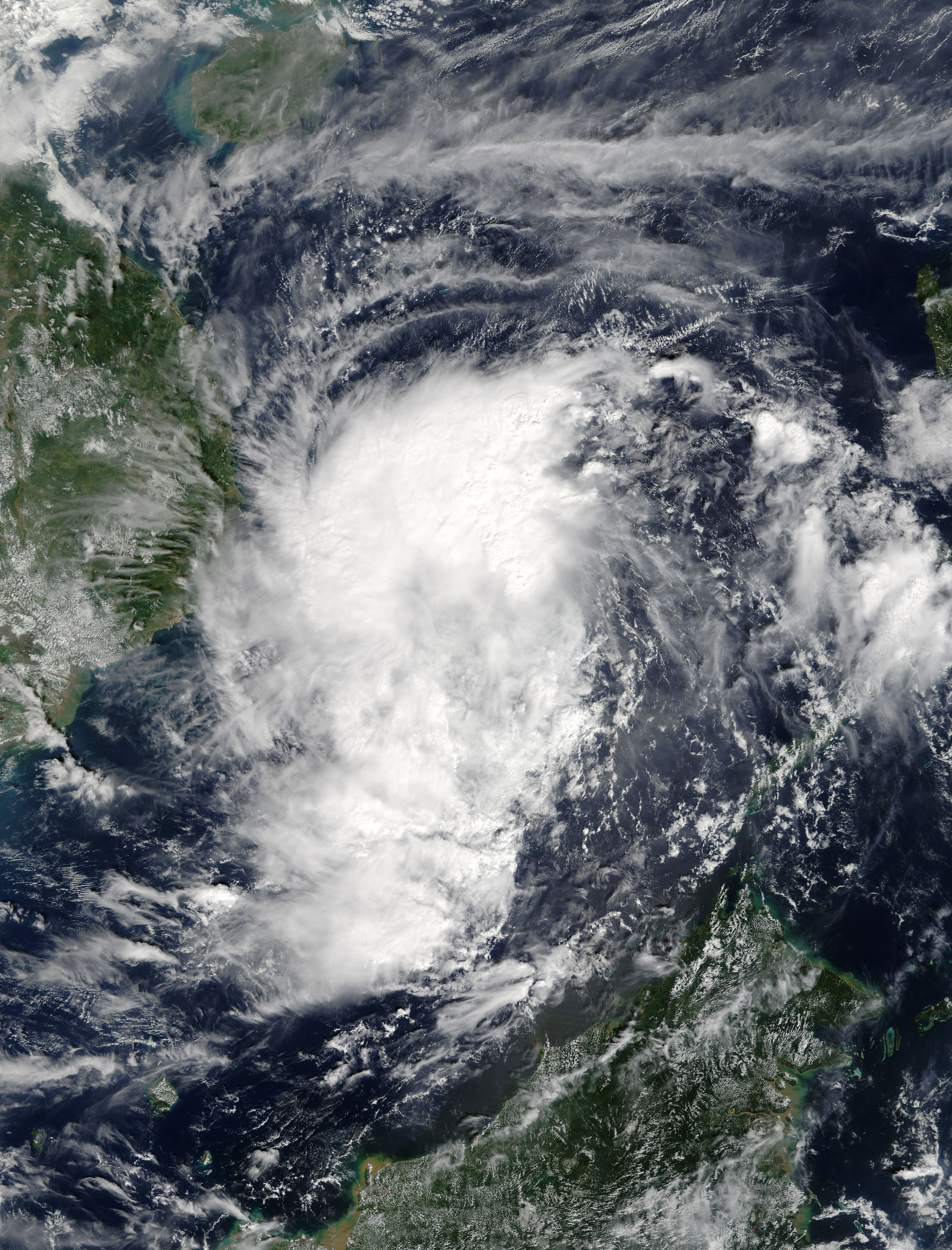
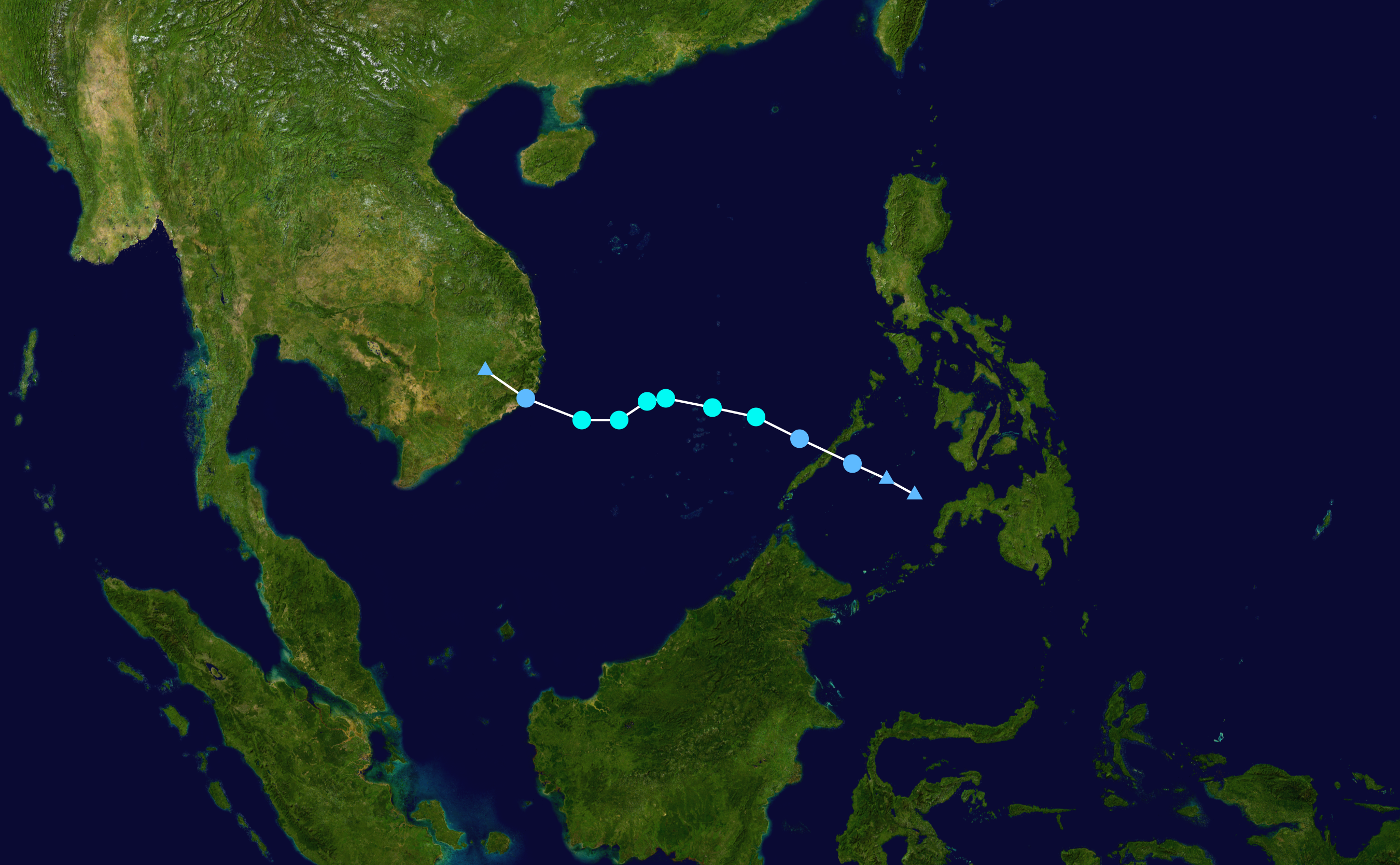
- Duration: November 16 – November 19
- Peak intensity: 65 km/h (40 mph) (10-min); 1000 hPa (mbar)

On November 16, a tropical Depression formed on Sulu Sea, with the PAGASA naming it Tino. At midnight on the same day, the system made landfall on Puerto Princesa. At about that time, the system intensified into a tropical storm, receiving the international name Kirogi by the JMA.

Kirogi caused flooding in the Philippines and Vietnam, with trees and power poles toppling in Ho Chi Minh City. Eight people were killed in Vietnam.

Several barangays in Mansalay were affected by floodwaters 0.5–1 meter (1.6–3.3 ft) deep; San Vicente received floods 1 metre (3.3 ft) deep. Three houses were damaged in Palawan; ports in Puerto Princesa, Coron, Palawan, Cuyo, Palawan, El Nido, Palawan, and Brooke's Point temporarily suspended operations, stranding 243 passengers. A total of 497 people were affected as a result of the storm.

Total economic losses in Vietnam were amounted to be US$10 million. The remnant energy of Tropical Storm Kirogi eventually contributed to the formation of Very Severe Cyclonic Storm Ockhi in the North Indian Ocean.

=== Tropical Storm Kai-tak (Urduja) ===
- Tropical storm (JMA)
- Tropical storm (SSHWS)
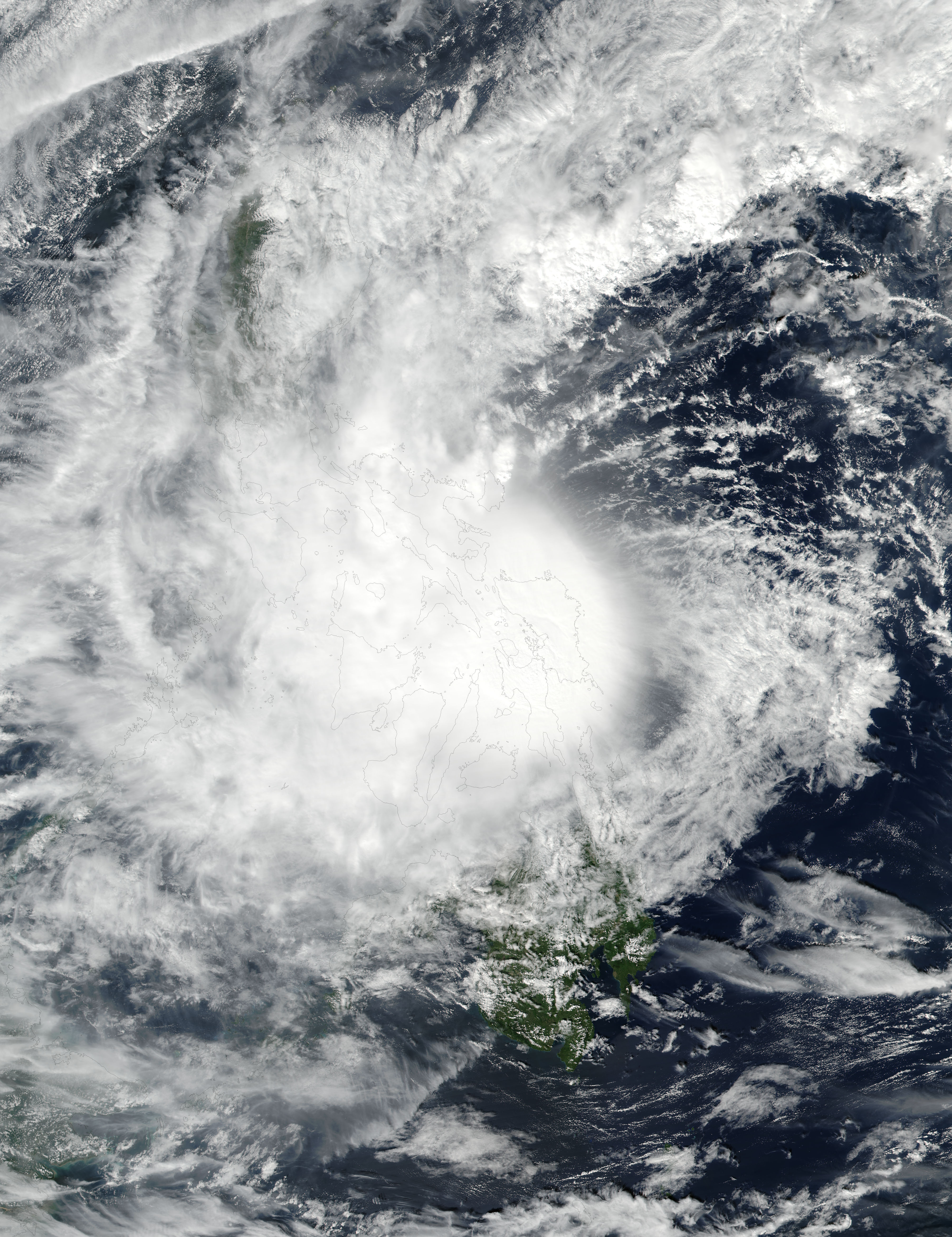
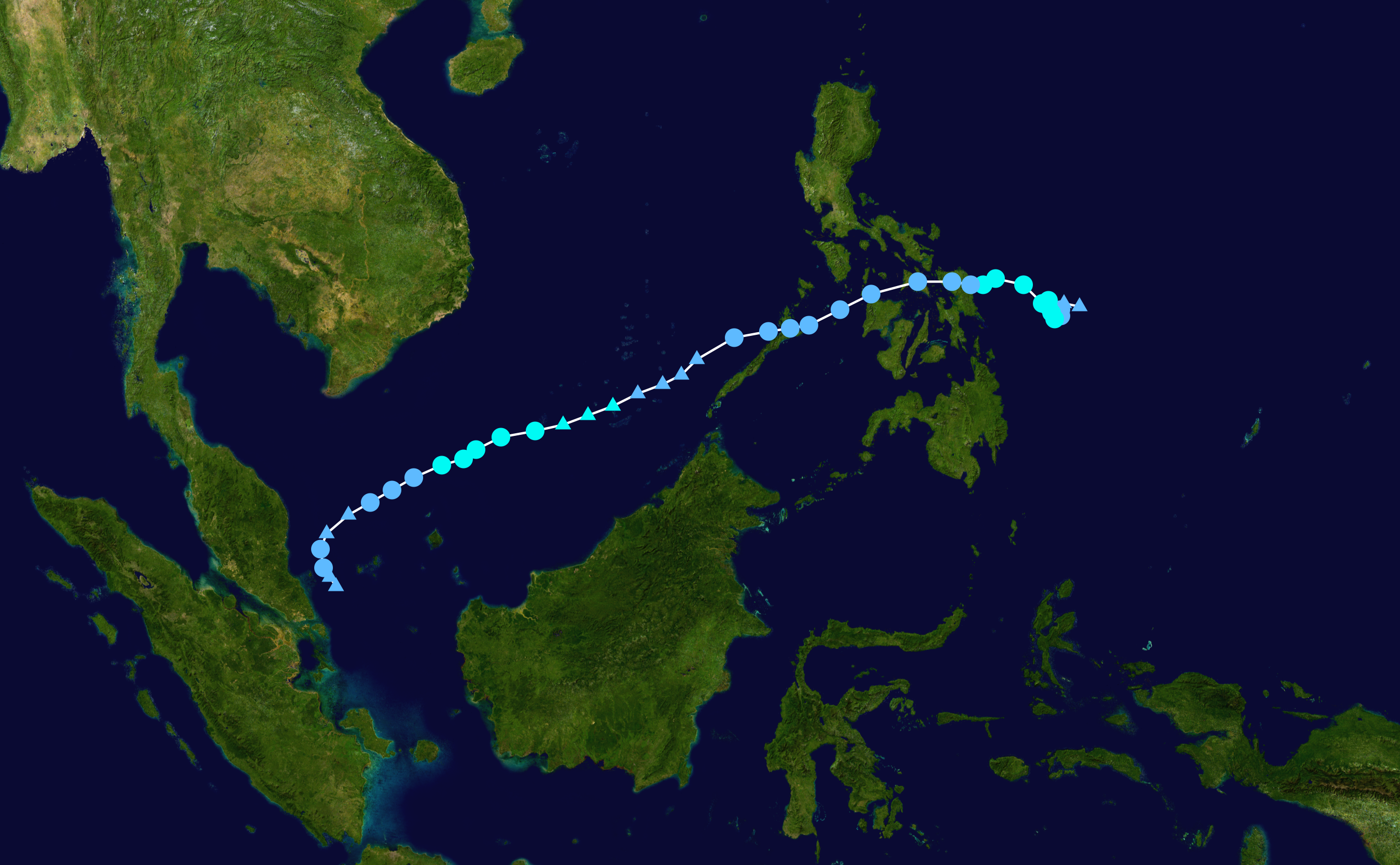
- Duration: December 13 – December 23
- Peak intensity: 75 km/h (45 mph) (10-min); 994 hPa (mbar)

A low-pressure area developed into a tropical depression east of Mindanao late on December 11, and the JMA began to issue tropical cyclone warnings early on the next day. It entered the Philippine Area of Responsibility nine hours later, receiving the name Urduja On 21:00 UTC of that same day, the JTWC upgraded the system to a tropical depression and also began issuing advisories, giving the identifier 32W. Despite the system being poorly organized with loose banding, the system also was located in an area of very low wind shear. Three hours later, the JMA upgraded the system to a tropical storm, assigning it the international name Kai-tak.

The city of Tacloban was later placed under a state of calamity as decided by their local council as 80 of the 130 villages were flooded. This resulted in at least 728 families (1,418 individuals) brought to evacuation centers or schools.

The NDRRMC confirmed a total of 83 people dead and calculated a total of ₱3.747 billion (US$74.3 million) worth of infrastructure and agricultural damages.

=== Typhoon Tembin (Vinta) ===
- Typhoon (JMA)
- Category 2 typhoon (SSHWS)
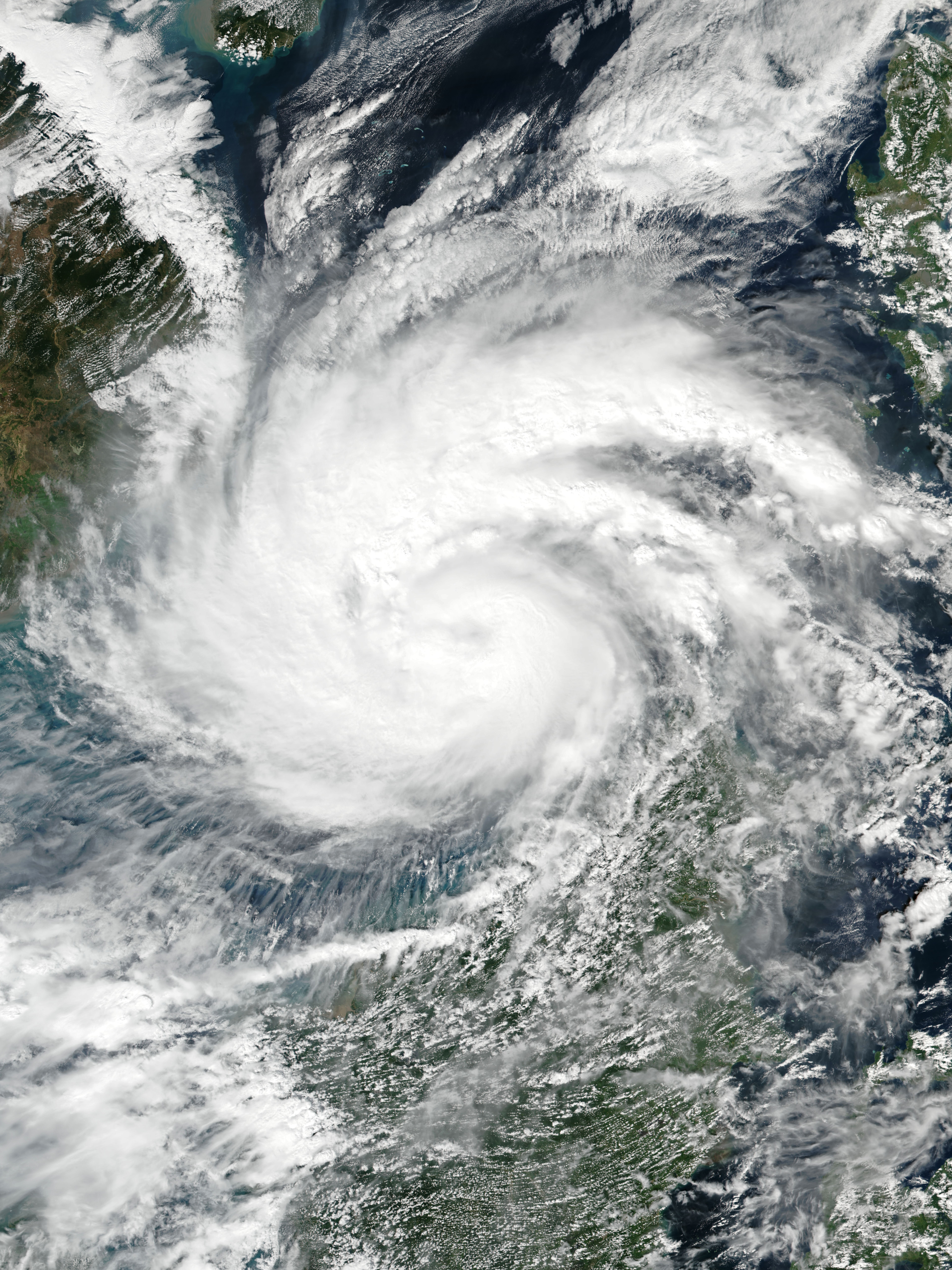
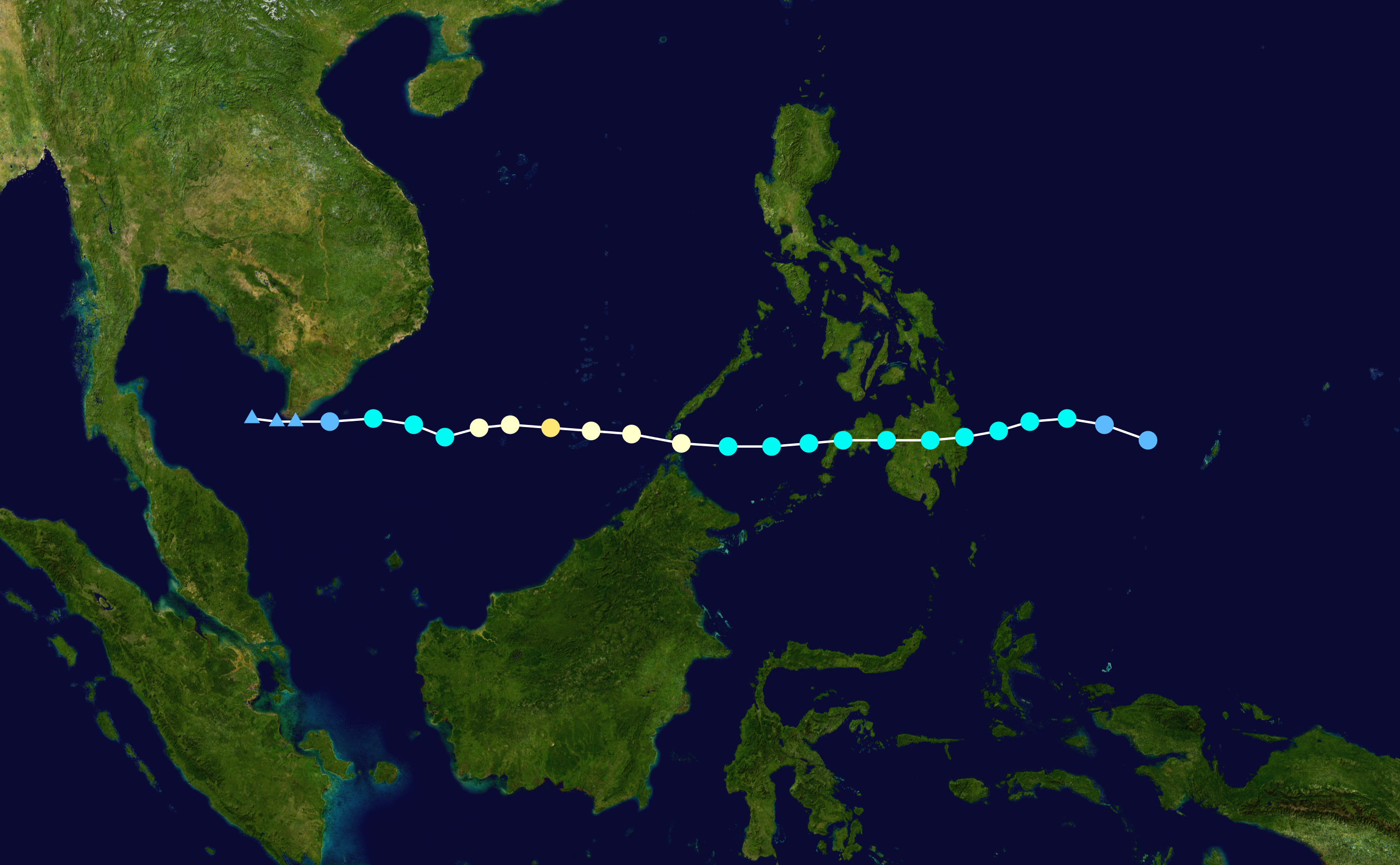
- Duration: December 20 – December 26
- Peak intensity: 130 km/h (80 mph) (10-min); 970 hPa (mbar)

During December 16, the JMA reported that a tropical depression had developed about 950 km (590 mi) to the southeast of Guam, before they reclassified it as an area of low pressure during the following day. Over the next few days, the system moved gradually north-westwards in favourable conditions, before it was reclassified as a tropical depression by the JMA during December 20, while it was located to the northeast of Palau. During that day, the JTWC and PAGASA also classified the system as a tropical depression with the latter naming it as Vinta, before the JMA named the system Tembin as it had developed into a tropical storm.

After the storm, on December 25, two towns in Zamboanga del Norte were under a state of calamity because of the flooding caused by the storm, which also made several roads and bridges impassible as they were covered in mud.

Rough waves caused by Tembin sank a ferry on December 22, killing five people. An additional 261 people were also killed due to flooding in Mindanao, of which 135 were reported in the province of Lanao del Norte. Estimated damages are around ₱2.1 billion (US$42 million).

=== Other systems ===
On March 19, a tropical depression formed close to the northeast of Mindanao, Philippines, and dissipated over the Sibuyan Sea two days later. Early on June 29, the JMA initiated advisories on a newly formed tropical depression located about 138 km (86 mi) south of Okinawa Island. The system re-curved and started moving in a northeastward direction until it dissipated to the southwest of Tokyo on July 1. Early on July 4, the JMA indicated that a tropical depression had formed about 505 km (314 mi) south of Okinotorishima. During the next day, the JTWC issued a Tropical Cyclone Formation Alert (TCFA) on the system, although it was canceled several hours later. After moving northward, the depression rapidly weakened as it was absorbed by a stationary front on July 7.

Early on July 13, the JMA reported that a non-tropical low had transitioned into a tropical depression about 75 km (45 mi) north-northeast of Iwo Jima. The depression moved in a generally northeasterly direction until weakening to a low-pressure area by 06:00 UTC on July 16. A tropical depression formed about 700 km (435 mi) northeast of Wake Island late on July 25, though the JTWC indicated it as a subtropical system with estimated recorded winds of 65 km/h (40 mph). After several days, the system had already transitioned into an extratropical cyclone on July 29, without becoming a tropical storm. Early on August 25 the JMA started to track a tropical depression over in the South China Sea, although it was last monitored during the next day when it was absorbed by the outflow of Tropical Storm Pakhar. On August 28, the JMA started to issue advisories on a tropical depression that had developed about 1,217 km (756 mi) east-northeast of Tuguegarao City. The JMA predicted that the system would become a tropical storm within the next 24 hours, although because the system did not develop further, the JMA issued their final advisory on 03:00 UTC of August 29 when the system had weakened into a low-pressure area. The remnants of the system helped with formation of Tropical Storm Mawar. On December 29, a weak tropical depression formed south-southwest of Palau. The system later strengthened into Tropical Storm Bolaven during the following year.

== Storm names ==
Within the Northwest Pacific Ocean, both the Japan Meteorological Agency (JMA) and PAGASA assign names to tropical cyclones that develop in the Western Pacific, which can result in a tropical cyclone having two names. The Japan Meteorological Agency's RSMC Tokyo — Typhoon Center assigns international names to tropical cyclones on behalf of the World Meteorological Organization's Typhoon Committee, should they be judged to have 10-minute sustained windspeeds of 65 km/h (40 mph). PAGASA assigns names to tropical cyclones which move into or form as a tropical depression in their area of responsibility located between 135°E–115°E and between 5°N–25°N even if the cyclone has had an international name assigned to it. The names of significant tropical cyclones are retired, by both PAGASA and the Typhoon Committee. Should the list of names for the Philippine region be exhausted then names will be taken from an auxiliary list of which the first ten are published each season. Unused names are marked in gray.

=== International names ===
During the season 27 tropical storms developed in the Western Pacific and each one was named by the JMA, when the system was judged to have 10-minute sustained windspeeds of 65 km/h (40 mph). The JMA selected the names from a list of 140 names, that had been developed by the 14 members nations and territories of the ESCAP/WMO Typhoon Committee. During the season, the names Hato and Lan were used for the first time (only time in the case of Hato), after they had replaced the names Washi and Vicente, which were retired after the 2011 and 2012 seasons, respectively.

Muifa	Merbok	Nanmadol	Talas	Noru	Kulap	Roke	Sonca	Nesat	Haitang	Nalgae	Banyan	Hato	Pakhar
Sanvu	Mawar	Guchol	Talim	Doksuri	Khanun	Lan	Saola	Damrey	Haikui	Kirogi	Kai-tak	Tembin	

==== Retirement ====
After the season, at their 50th Session in 2018 the ESCAP/WMO Typhoon Committee announced that the names Hato, Kai-tak and Tembin were removed from the naming lists due to the number of deaths and amount of damages each one caused in their respective onslaughts, and they will not be used again for another typhoon name. In 2019, they were replaced by Yamaneko, Yun-yeung and Koinu, respectively.

=== Philippines ===
Auring	Bising	Crising	Dante	Emong
Fabian	Gorio	Huaning	Isang	Jolina
Kiko	Lannie	Maring	Nando	Odette
Paolo	Quedan	Ramil	Salome	Tino
Urduja	Vinta	Wilma (unused)	Yasmin (unused)	Zoraida (unused)
Auxiliary list
Alamid (unused)	Bruno (unused)	Conching (unused)	Dolor (unused)	Ernie (unused)
Florante (unused)	Gerardo (unused)	Herman (unused)	Isko (unused)	Jaime (unused)

During the season PAGASA used its own naming scheme for the 22 tropical cyclones, that either developed within or moved into their self-defined area of responsibility. The names were taken from a list of names, that was last used during the 2013 season and was used again during the 2021 season. All of the names are the same except for Lannie, Salome and Yasmin, which replaced the names Labuyo, Santi and Yolanda after they were retired. The names Lannie and Salome were used for the first time this year.

==== Retirement ====
On December 21, PAGASA announced that it would remove the names Urduja and Vinta from their naming lists after they caused over ₱1 billion in damage. They were replaced with Uwan and Verbena in 2021.

== Season effects ==
This table summarizes all the systems that developed within or moved into the northern Pacific Ocean, to the west of the International Date Line during 2017. The tables also provide an overview of a systems intensity, duration, land areas affected and any deaths or damages associated with the system.

Name	Dates	Peak intensity			Areas affected	Damage (USD)	Deaths	Ref(s).
Name	Dates	Category	Wind speed	Pressure	Areas affected	Damage (USD)	Deaths	Ref(s).
01W (Auring)	January 7–16	Tropical depression	55 km/h (35 mph)	1,002 hPa (29.59 inHg)	Philippines, Vietnam, Cambodia	$144,000	11	
Bising	February 3–7	Tropical depression	55 km/h (35 mph)	1,000 hPa (29.53 inHg)	None	None	None	
TD	March 19–21	Tropical depression	Not specified	1,008 hPa (29.77 inHg)	Philippines	None	None	
02W (Crising)	April 13–19	Tropical depression	55 km/h (35 mph)	1,006 hPa (29.71 inHg)	Philippines, Taiwan	$1.7 million	10	
Muifa (Dante)	April 22–29	Tropical storm	65 km/h (40 mph)	1,002 hPa (29.59 inHg)	None	None	None	
Merbok	June 10–13	Severe tropical storm	100 km/h (60 mph)	985 hPa (29.09 inHg)	Philippines, South China (Note: South China includes the provinces of Hainan, Guangxi, Guangdong, Hong Kong and Macau)	$88.3 million	None	
TD	June 29 – July 1	Tropical depression	Not specified	1,008 hPa (29.77 inHg)	Japan	None	None	
Nanmadol (Emong)	July 1–4	Severe tropical storm	100 km/h (60 mph)	985 hPa (29.09 inHg)	Japan	$1.68 billion	42	
TD	July 4–7	Tropical depression	55 km/h (35 mph)	1,010 hPa (29.83 inHg)	Taiwan, Ryukyu Islands	None	None	
TD	July 13–16	Tropical depression	55 km/h (35 mph)	1,006 hPa (29.71 inHg)	None	None	None	
Talas	July 14–17	Severe tropical storm	95 km/h (60 mph)	985 hPa (29.09 inHg)	Hainan, Indochina (Note: Indochina is an area in Southeast Asia which includes Vietnam, Cambodia, Laos, Malaysia, Myanmar and Thailand)	$118 million	14	
Noru	July 19 – August 8	Very strong typhoon	175 km/h (110 mph)	935 hPa (27.61 inHg)	Japan	$100 million	2	
Kulap	July 20–28	Tropical storm	75 km/h (45 mph)	1,002 hPa (29.59 inHg)	None	None	None	
Sonca	July 21–29	Tropical storm	65 km/h (40 mph)	994 hPa (29.35 inHg)	Hainan, Indochina	$313 million	37	
Roke (Fabian)	July 21–23	Tropical storm	65 km/h (40 mph)	1,002 hPa (29.59 inHg)	Philippines, Taiwan, South China	None	None	
Nesat (Gorio)	July 25–30	Strong typhoon	150 km/h (95 mph)	960 hPa (28.35 inHg)	Philippines, Ryukyu Islands, Taiwan, East China	$282 million	3	
TD	July 25–29	Tropical depression	55 km/h (35 mph)	1,006 hPa (29.71 inHg)	None	None	None	
Haitang (Huaning)	July 27 – August 2	Tropical storm	85 km/h (55 mph)	985 hPa (29.09 inHg)	Taiwan, East China	$3.43 million	None	
Nalgae	July 31 – August 5	Tropical storm	85 km/h (55 mph)	990 hPa (29.23 inHg)	None	None	None	
Banyan	August 10–17	Strong typhoon	150 km/h (95 mph)	955 hPa (28.20 inHg)	None	None	None	
Hato (Isang)	August 19–24	Strong typhoon	140 km/h (85 mph)	965 hPa (28.50 inHg)	Philippines, Taiwan, South China, Vietnam	$6.4 billion	24	
Pakhar (Jolina)	August 24–27	Severe tropical storm	100 km/h (60 mph)	985 hPa (29.09 inHg)	Philippines, South China, Vietnam, Thailand	$115 million	13	
TD	August 25–26	Tropical depression	Not specified	1,002 hPa (29.59 inHg)	Vietnam	None	None	
Sanvu	August 27 – September 3	Strong typhoon	150 km/h (95 mph)	955 hPa (28.20 inHg)	Mariana Islands, Ogasawara Islands	Unknown	1	
TD	August 28–29	Tropical depression	55 km/h (35 mph)	1,002 hPa (29.59 inHg)	Philippines	None	None	
Mawar	August 30 – September 4	Severe tropical storm	95 km/h (60 mph)	990 hPa (29.23 inHg)	Philippines, South China	$1.53 million	None	
Guchol (Kiko)	September 3–7	Tropical storm	65 km/h (40 mph)	1,000 hPa (29.53 inHg)	Philippines, Taiwan, East China	None	None	
Talim (Lannie)	September 8–17	Very strong typhoon	175 km/h (110 mph)	935 hPa (27.61 inHg)	Mariana Islands, Taiwan, East China, Japan	$750 million	5	
Doksuri (Maring)	September 10–16	Strong typhoon	150 km/h (95 mph)	955 hPa (28.20 inHg)	Philippines, Hainan, Indochina, Bangladesh	$836 million	29	
22W (Nando)	September 23–25	Tropical depression	55 km/h (35 mph)	1,002 hPa (29.59 inHg)	Philippines, South China, Vietnam	Minimal	None	
23W	October 7–10	Tropical depression	55 km/h (35 mph)	1,000 hPa (29.53 inHg)	Philippines, Hainan, Indochina	$609 million	109	
Khanun (Odette)	October 11–16	Strong typhoon	140 km/h (85 mph)	955 hPa (28.20 inHg)	Philippines, Taiwan, South China, Vietnam	$373 million	1	
Lan (Paolo)	October 15–23	Very strong typhoon	185 km/h (115 mph)	915 hPa (27.02 inHg)	Caroline Islands, Philippines, Japan	$2 billion	17	
26W	October 18–19	Tropical depression	45 km/h (30 mph)	1,002 hPa (29.59 inHg)	Philippines	Minimal	14	
Saola (Quedan)	October 22–29	Severe tropical storm	110 km/h (70 mph)	975 hPa (28.79 inHg)	Caroline Islands, Japan	$250 million	None	
29W	October 30 – November 8	Tropical depression	55 km/h (35 mph)	1,006 hPa (29.71 inHg)	Vietnam, Cambodia, Thailand, Malaysia	Minimal	7	
Damrey (Ramil)	October 31 – November 4	Strong typhoon	130 km/h (80 mph)	970 hPa (28.64 inHg)	Philippines, Vietnam, Cambodia	$1 billion	142	
Haikui (Salome)	November 7–13	Tropical storm	75 km/h (45 mph)	998 hPa (29.47 inHg)	Philippines, South China, Vietnam	$4.26 million	None	
Kirogi (Tino)	November 16–19	Tropical storm	65 km/h (40 mph)	1,000 hPa (29.53 inHg)	Philippines, Malaysia, Indochina	$10 million	8	
Kai-tak (Urduja)	December 13–23	Tropical storm	75 km/h (45 mph)	994 hPa (29.35 inHg)	Philippines, Malaysia, Indonesia, Vietnam	$74.3 million	83	
Tembin (Vinta)	December 20–26	Strong typhoon	130 km/h (80 mph)	970 hPa (28.64 inHg)	Caroline Islands, Philippines, Indonesia, Malaysia, Vietnam	$42 million	266	
Season aggregates
42 systems	January 7 – December 26, 2017		185 km/h (115 mph)	915 hPa (27.02 inHg)		$15.1 billion	838	

== See also ==
- Weather of 2017
- Tropical cyclones in 2017
- Pacific typhoon season
- 2017 Atlantic hurricane season
- 2016–17 Australian region cyclone season
- 2017–18 Australian region cyclone season
- 2017 North Indian Ocean cyclone season
- 2017 Pacific hurricane season
- 2016–17 South Pacific cyclone season
- 2017–18 South Pacific cyclone season
- 2016–17 South-West Indian Ocean cyclone season
- 2017–18 South-West Indian Ocean cyclone season

== Notes ==
Preceded by 2016	Pacific typhoon season 2017	Succeeded by 2018
