= Vince =

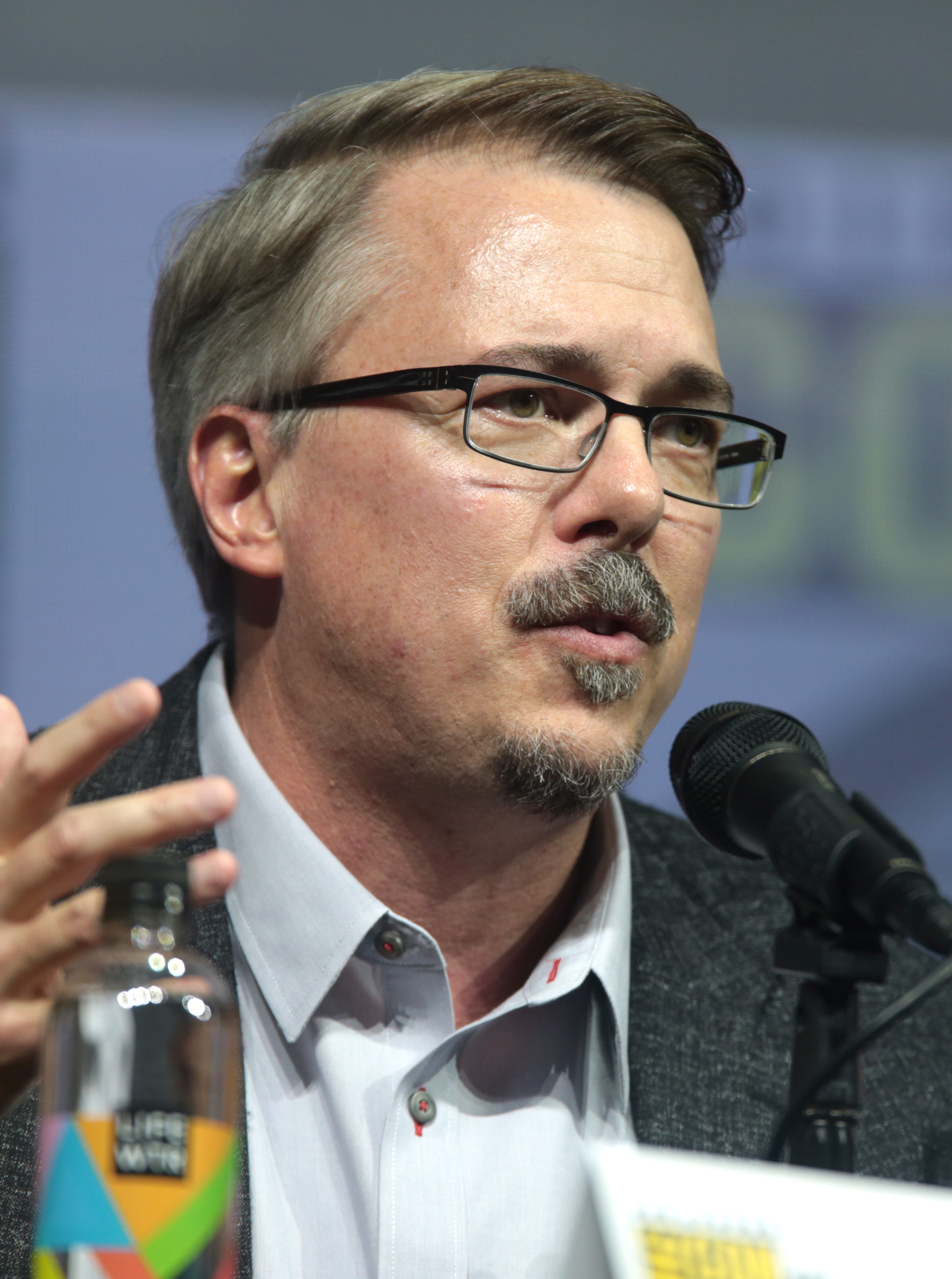
- Vince Gilligan in 2018
- Pronunciation: /vɪns/
- Gender: Male

Other names
- Related names: Vincent, Vinny, Vin

Vince is a given name, it is the anglicisation and shortened form of the name Vincent, as well as a surname. It may refer to:

== Given name ==
=== People ===
- Vince Agnew (born 1987), American football player
- Vince Cable (born 1943), British politician
- Vince Carter (born 1977), basketball player
- Vince Catania (born 1977), Australian politician
- Vince Clarke (born 1960), English musician with Erasure
- Vince Clarke (cricketer) (born 1971), English cricketer
- Vince Coleman (disambiguation), multiple people
- Vince Courville (born 1959), American football player
- Vince DiMaggio (1912–1986), American baseball player, older brother of Joe DiMaggio
- Vince Dooley (1932–2022), American football coach
- Vince Gill (born 1957), American country music singer, songwriter and musician
- Vince Gilligan (born 1967), American writer, producer, as well as creator and director of AMC's Breaking Bad & spin-off Better Call Saul
- Vince Giordano (born 1952), American musician
- Vince Guaraldi (1928–1976), American jazz pianist and jazz composer
- Vince Hill (1934–2023), English singer and songwriter
- Vince Hill (American football) (born 1985), American football player
- Vince Kinney (born 1956), American football player
- Vince Little (born 1964), American professional stock car racing driver
- Vince Lombardi (1913–1970), American football player, coach, and executive
- Vince Luvara (born 1989), American college football coach
- Vince Martin (disambiguation), multiple people
- Vince McMahon, Sr. (1914–1984), American wrestling promoter
- Vince McMahon (born 1945), Former CEO of World Wrestling Entertainment
- Vince Micone, U.S. deputy assistant secretary of labor for operations
- Vince Neil (born 1961), Lead singer, Mötley Crüe
- Vince Offer (born 1964), American-Israeli infomercial salesman, born Offer Shlomi
- Vince Osuji (born 2006), Nigerian footballer
- Vince O'Sullivan (born 1957), American race walker
- Vince Phillips (born 1963), American boxer and IBF champion
- Vince Powell (1928–2009), British sitcom writer
- Vince Promuto (1938–2021), American football player
- Vince Sorrenti, Australian actor
- Vince Staples (born 1993), American rapper
- Vince Steckler (1958–2021), American businessman
- Vince Vaughn (born 1970), American actor
- Vince Velasquez (born 1992), American Major League Baseball pitcher for the Philadelphia Phillies
- Vince White (born 1960), English guitarist with The Clash
- Vince Young (born 1983), American football player
- Vince Zampella (1970–2025), American video game designer
- Vince Zizak (1908–1973), American football player

=== Fictional characters ===
- Vince Clark, the main character in the British sitcom 15 Storeys High
- Vince Larkin, the secondary main character in the 1997 action thriller film Con Air, played by John Cusack
- Vince LaSalle, main character of the American television series Recess
- Vince Noir, main character of the British comedy series The Mighty Boosh
- Vincent Fox (commonly referred to as Vince), a main character on the television series Mongrels

=== Animals ===
- Vince (rhinoceros) (2012–2017), killed by poachers while in a French zoo

== Surname ==
- Alan Vince (1952–2009), British archaeologist
- Allen Vince (ca. 1785–1849), settler in Texas
- Bernie Vince (born 1985), former Australian rules footballer
- Gaia Vince, British journalist, broadcaster and non-fiction author
- James Vince (born 1991), English cricketer
- John Vince (1849–1886), English cricketer
- Michael Vince (born 1947), British poet and author
- Pruitt Taylor Vince (born 1960), American actor
- Ralph Vince (1900–1996), American football player and coach, inventor of the football face mask
- Samuel Vince (1749–1821), English clergyman, mathematician and astronomer
- William Vince (1963–2008), Canadian film producer

== See also ==
- Vicente (disambiguation)
- Vincent (disambiguation)
- Vincente
- Vincenzo
