= Vini =

Vini may refer to:

== People ==
- Vinícius Júnior (born 2000), Brazilian footballer
- Vini Ciccarello (born 1947), Australian politician
- Vini Dantas (born 1989), Brazilian footballer
- Vini Flores (born 1984), Brazilian futsal player
- Vini Locatelli (born 1998), Brazilian footballer Vinícius Farias Locatelli
- Vini Lopez (born 1949), American rock drummer
- Vini Paulista (born 2001), Brazilian footballer Vinicius Romualdo dos Santos
- Vini Poncia (born 1942), American musician, songwriter and record producer
- Vini Reilly (born 1953), English musician
- Vini Vishwa Lal (born 1985), Indian screenwriter
- Vini Vitharana (1928–2019), Sri Lankan linguist
- Vini (footballer) (Vinicius Frasson; born 1984), Brazilian footballer
- Sebastiano Vini (1515–1602), Italian painter

== Other uses ==
- Vini (bird), a genus of birds in the family Psittaculidae
- Vini (letter), 6th letter of the three Georgian scripts
- Vini TV, a subscription television operator in French Polynesia

== See also ==
- Vinni (disambiguation)
- Vinny, a list of people and fictional characters named Vinny or Vinnie
- Vinnie, Kentucky, United States, an unincorporated community
- Vinny, Astrakhan Oblast, Russia, a rural locality
