= Vinni (disambiguation) =

Vinni is the stage name of Norwegian musician Øyvind Sauvik.

Vinni may also refer to:

== People ==
- Vinni Corrêa (born 1981), Brazilian poet, visual artist, and erotologist
- Vinni Lettieri (born 1995), American professional ice hockey
- Vinni Triboulet (born 1999), Cameroonian footballer

== Places ==
- Vinni Parish, Estonia
  - Vinni, Estonia, a borough in the parish

== See also ==
- Vinny, a list of people and fictional characters named Vinny or Vinnie
- Vinnie, Kentucky, United States, an unincorporated community
- Vinny, Astrakhan Oblast, Russia, a rural locality
- Vini (disambiguation)
