= Vinzenz =

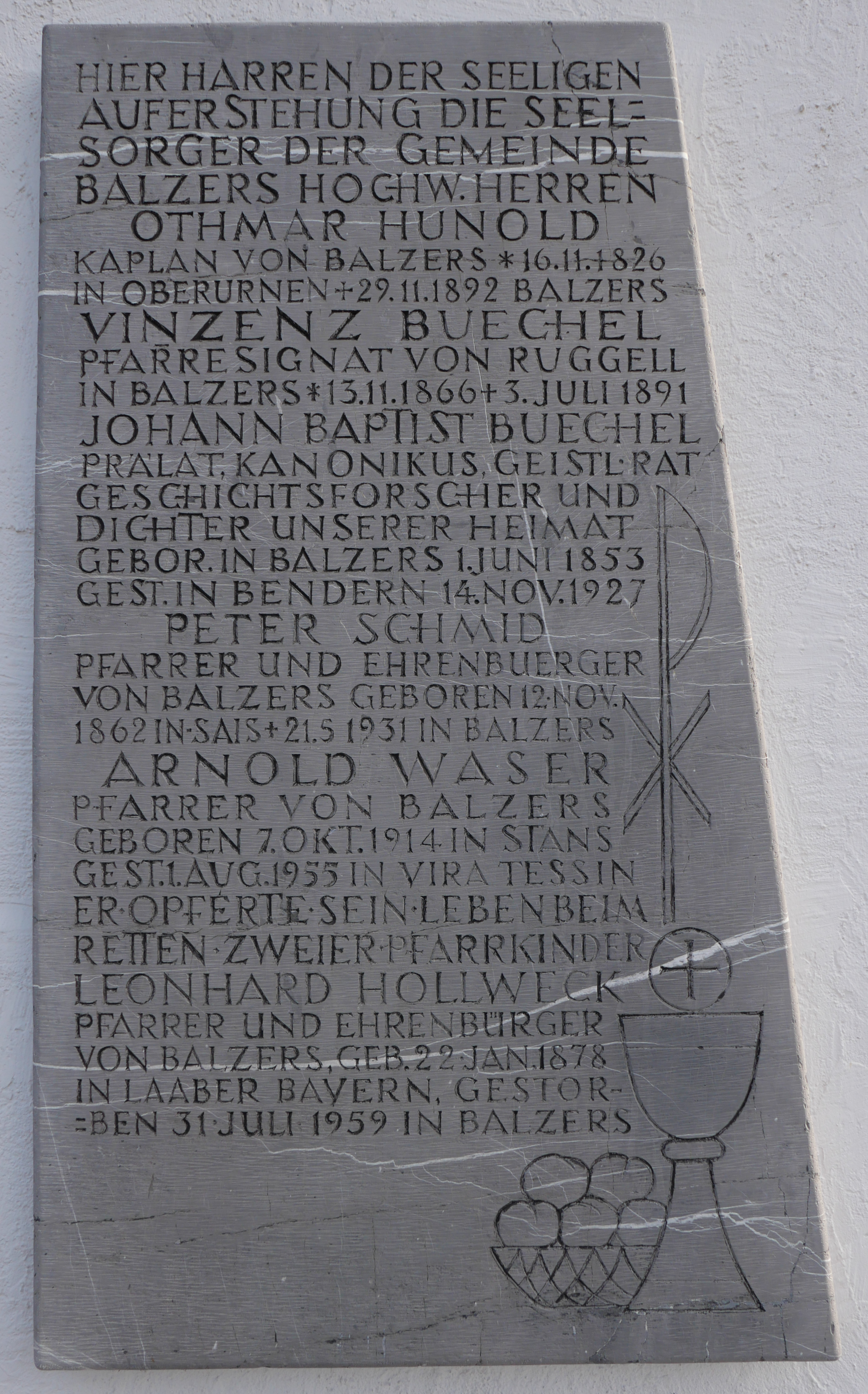
Priest plaque-old cemetery, Balzers, Lichtenstein

Vinzenz is a given name. Notable people with the name include:

- Vinzenz Bronzin (1872–1970), professor of mathematics in Trieste, Italy
- Vinzenz Dittrich (1890–1965), Austrian football (soccer) player in defender role and manager
- Vinzenz Fux (1606–1659), organist of the church Maria am Gestade in Vienna, then joined the chapel of the widowed Empress Eleanora
- Vinzenz Maria Gredler (1823–1912), Austrian naturalist
- Vinzenz Kaiser, Obersturmbannführer in the Waffen SS during World War II, awarded the Knight's Cross of the Iron Cross
- Vinzenz Georg Kiefer, German actor
- Franz Vinzenz Krommer (1759–1831), Czech composer of classical music
- Vinzenz Lachner (1811–1893), German composer and conductor
- Carl Alois Johann-Nepomuk Vinzenz, Fuerst Lichnowsky (1761–1814), second Prince Lichnowsky and a Chamberlain at the Imperial Austrian court
- Vinzenz Eduard Milde (1777–1853), Prince-Archbishop of Vienna
- Vinzenz Schöttl (1905–1946), German Nazi concentration camp SS officer executed for war crimes
- Ignaz Vinzenz Zingerle von Summersberg (1825–1892), Austrian poet and scholar
- Vinzenz von Wartenberg (1379–1419), commander of the Royalist Bohemian forces at the start of the Hussite Wars
- Vinzenz Ziswiler (1935–2025), Swiss zoologist

== See also ==
- Vinzenz Lausmann Memorial State Natural Area, state park in northern Hood River County, Oregon, USA
- Vincenzo
- Vinzel
