= Vincenz =

Vincenz is a given name. Notable people with the name include:

- Vincenz Armann (1599–1649), Flemish or Dutch landscape painter
- Vincenz Czerny (1842–1916), German Bohemian surgeon
- Vincenz Fettmilch (died 1616), grocer and gingerbread baker who led the Fettmilch uprising
- Vincenz Fischer (1729–1810), historical painter and professor of architecture at the Academy of Vienna
- Vincenz Fohmann (1794–1837), German-Belgian anatomist born
- Vincenz Fux (1606–1659), Austrian musician and composer
- Vincenz Grimm (1800–1872), Hungarian chess master
- Vincenz Hasak (1812–1889), Catholic historian
- Vincenz Hruby (1856–1917), Czech chess master
- Vincenz Hundhausen (1878–1955), German-language professor at Peking University
- Vincenz Kollar (1797–1860), Austrian entomologist who specialised in Diptera
- Julius Vincenz von Krombholz (1782–1843), physician and mycologist
- Vincenz Lachner (1811–1893), German composer and conductor
- Vincenz Liechtenstein (1950–2008), Austrian politician (ÖVP)
- Vincenz Mayer (born 1990), German professional ice hockey player
- Vincenz Eduard Milde (1777–1853), Prince-Archbishop of Vienna
- Vincenz Müller (1894–1961), German military officer and general
- Vincenz Priessnitz (1799–1851), peasant farmer considered the founder of modern hydrotherapy
- Ignaz Vincenz Zingerle (1825–1892), Austrian poet and scholar

== See also ==
- Lilli Vincenz, lesbian activist, member of the Mattachine Society of Washington
- Vincenzi
- Vincenzo
