= Vincenzo =

- Pronunciation: Italian: [vinˈtʃɛntso]
- Gender: Male

Origin
- Origin: Latin
- Meaning: Vincent
- Region of origin: Italy

Other names
- Nicknames: Enzo, Vin, Vince, Vinny, Vinnie, Cenzo
- Related names: Vincent, Vincente, Vicente, Vincentius

Vincenzo is an Italian male given name, derived from the Latin name Vincentius (the verb vincere means to win or to conquer). Notable people with the name include:

== Art ==
- Vincenzo Amato (born 1966), Italian actor and sculptor
- Vincenzo Bellavere (c.1540-1541–1587), Italian composer
- Vincenzo Bellini (1801–1835), Italian composer
- Vincenzo Camille (also known as Fakemink) (born 2005), English rapper and producer
- Vincenzo Camuccini (1771–1844), Italian academic painter
- Vincenzo Catena (c. 1470–1531), Italian painter
- Vincenzo Cerami (1940–2013), Italian screenwriter
- Vincenzo Consolo (1933–2012), Italian writer
- Vincenzo Coronelli (1650–1718), Franciscan friar, cosmographer, cartographer, publisher, and encyclopedist
- Vincenzo Crocitti (1949–2010), Italian cinema and television actor
- Vincenzo Dimech (1768–1831), Maltese sculptor
- Vincenzo Galilei (1520–1591), composer, lutenist, and music theorist, father of Galileo
- Vincenzo Gemito (1852–1929), Italian sculptor and artist
- Vincenzo Marra (born 1972), Italian filmmaker
- Vincenzo Migliaro (1858–1938), Italian painter
- Vincenzo Natali (born 1969), Canadian film director
- Vincenzo Nicoli (born 1958), English actor
- Vincenzo Talarico (1909–1972), Italian screenwriter and film actor

== Politics ==
- Vincenzo Aita (born 1948), Italian politician
- Vincenzo Amendola (born 1973), Italian politician
- Vincenzo Arangio-Ruiz (1884–1964), Italian politician
- Vincenzo Balzamo (1929–1992), Italian politician
- Vincenzo Gonzaga, Duke of Mantua (1562–1612), ruler of the Duchy of Mantua and the Duchy of Montferrat from 1587 to 1612
- Vincenzo II Gonzaga, Duke of Mantua (1594–1627), Duke of Mantua and Duke of Montferrat from 1626 to 1627
- Vincenzo Lavarra (born 1954), Italian politician
- Vincenzo Scotti (born 1933), Italian politician
- Vincenzo Tangorra (1866–1922), Italian academic and politician

== Religion ==
- Vincenzo, Martyr of Craco, minor saint of the Roman Catholic Church
- Vincenzo Macchi (1770–1860), Italian cardinal
- Vincenzo Rimedio (born 1927), Italian bishop
- Vincenzo Maria Sarnelli (1835–1898), Italian archbishop
- Vincenzo Vannutelli (1836–1930), Italian cardinal
- Vincenzo Zarri (1929–2026), Italian bishop

== Sports ==
- Vincenzo Annese (born 1984), Italian football manager and former player
- Vincenzo Capelli (born 1988), Italian rower
- Vincenzo Cuccia (1892–1979), Italian fencer
- Vincenzo Damista (born 1963), Italian sprint canoeist
- Vincenzo Di Bella (born 1977), Italian rally driver
- Vincenzo Guerini (athlete) (born 1950), Italian sprinter
- Vincenzo Guerini (footballer) (born 1953), Italian football player
- Vincenzo Grella (born 1979), Australian football player
- Vincenzo Grifo (born 1993), German-born Italian footballer
- Vincenzo Iaquinta (born 1979), Italian football player
- Vincenzo Marchese (born 1983), Italian-German football player
- Vincenzo Modica (born 1971), Italian long-distance runner
- Vincenzo Montella (born 1974), Italian football player
- Vincenzo Nibali (born 1984), Italian road bicycle racer
- Vincenzo Santopadre (born 1971), Italian tennis player
- Vincenzo Sospiri (born 1966), Italian racing driver

== Characters ==
- Justin Vincenzo Pepé Russo, a.k.a. Justin Russo, a character from Wizards of Waverly Place
- Vincenzo Cassano, the titular character from Vincenzo (TV series)
- Vincenzo Santorini, nicknamed "Vinny", a character from Atlantis: The Lost Empire
- Vincenzo Cilli, nicknamed "Lucky", A character from Grand Theft Auto: Liberty City Stories

== Others ==
- Vincenzo Baldoni (1924–2003), Italian architect and urban planner
- Vincenzo Borg (1777–1837), Maltese merchant and rebel leader
- Vincenzo Cilli, the Caporegime of Salvatore Leone in Liberty City Stories
- Vincenzo Dandolo (1758–1819) Italian Count, chemist and agriculturist
- Vincenzo Fasolo (1885–1969), Italian architect, engineer, urban planner, and architectural historian
- Vincenzo Galdi (academic) (born 1970), Italian electrical engineer and academic
- Vincenzo Gallina (1795–1842) Italian carbonari, lawyer and philhellene
- Vincenzo Gambi (died 1819), 19th-century Italian pirate
- Vincenzo Giustiniani (1564–1637), Italian banker, art collector and intellectual
- Vincenzo Peruggia (1881–1925), Italian thief who stole the Mona Lisa
- Vincenzo Romeo (born 1979), Italian mafioso
- Vincenzo Scamozzi (1548–1616), Italian architect
- Vincenzo Viviani (1622–1703), Italian mathematician and scientist
- Vincenzo Zappalà (born 1945), Italian astronomer
- Vincenzo Buonassisi (1918–2004), Italian journalist and gastronome

== See also ==
- San Vincenzo (disambiguation), a number of places
- DiVincenzo (disambiguation)
- Castel San Vincenzo, comune (municipality) in the Province of Isernia in the Italian region Molise
- Enzo, people with the given name
- Vicenza, a city in northeastern Italy
- Vincenz, people with the given name
- Vinzenz, people with the given name
