= Scott Martin Brooks =

American actor

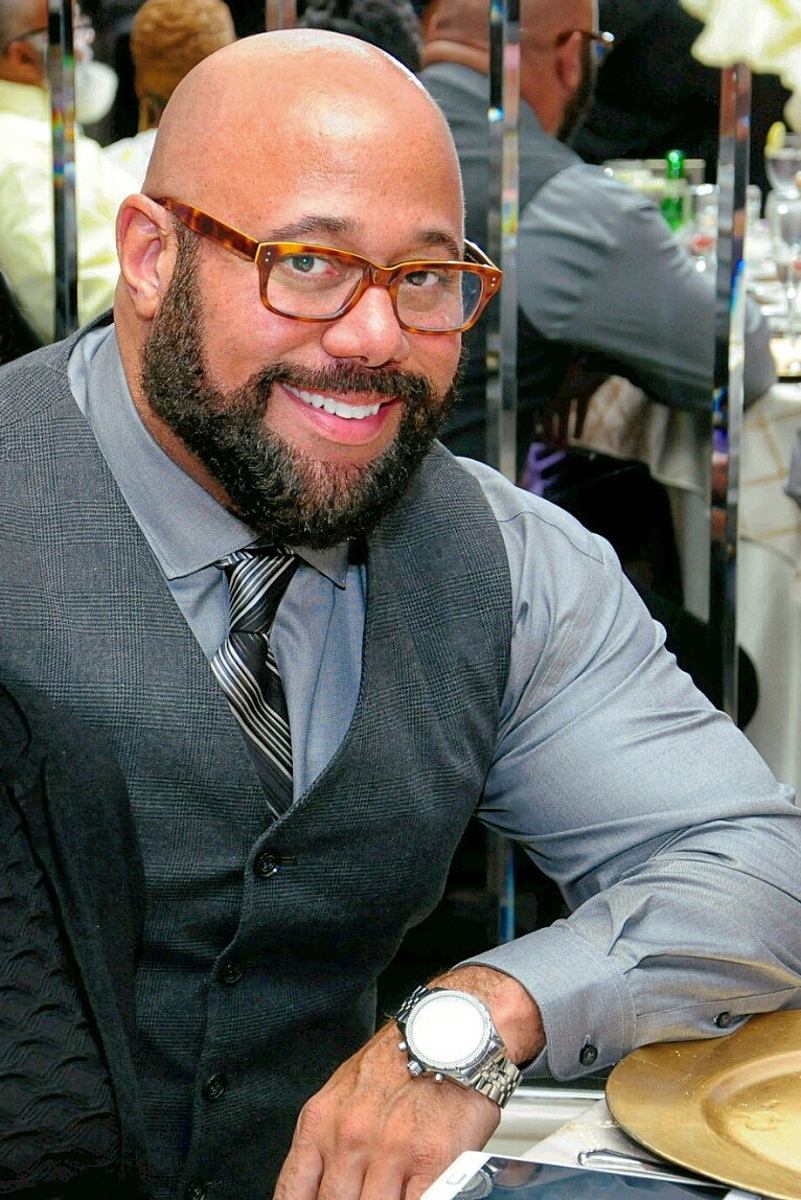
- Scott Martin Brooks in 2017
- Born: Scott Martin Brooks; Philadelphia, Pennsylvania
- Other name: Dookie

Scott Martin Brooks is an American actor, best known as the character "Dookie" in the "Whassup?" series of television commercials for Budweiser brand of beer.

== Early life and education ==
Scott Martin Brooks was adopted at birth and raised in Philadelphia, Pennsylvania. On his old MySpace page, Brooks described himself as "a poor black child from the mean streets of West Philly...the REAL West Philly, not that suburb 'Fresh Prince' was from." Brooks' father died when he was 12, he was then raised by his mother and two older sisters. Throughout his childhood and teens, Brooks studied classical piano for 10 years, performing in many recitals, he was heavily involved in his local church, he was a competitive swimmer for 5 years, competed in track & field in two different leagues, and played JV baseball his freshman year (earning a letter). From ages 11 to 18 he acted in many plays for a local theater group, and when he was 19 he studied acting at the John Barth Acting Studios in Philadelphia.

Brooks was an above average student during high school, but received several awards for Art, and excelled in English and History, and after graduation, he attended college as a business management major. After one year he left school, then he and his best friend borrowed money from their families and opened their own business; a popular neighborhood video rental store. After 4 years and 2 stores, Brooks and his partner sold the business. Soon after, he took his first job in the nightlife industry as a bouncer in a local "gentleman's club", which turned into a ten-year career in the Philadelphia nightclub scene, becoming a well-known and sought-after doorman and head of security. Also during this time, along with several co-workers, Brooks became a partner in an infamous, underground, after-hours nightclub.

While Brooks was working in the Philadelphia nightclub scene, his childhood friend Charles Stone was making a name for himself in New York City as a music video director. Starting back when they were teenagers, Stone would often cast Brooks in his school projects, short films and music videos. In 1998, Stone came up with the original "Whassup" concept; a three-minute film entitled True. When he decided to make the film, Stone told Brooks, "It’s based on us, and something we used to do back in the day."

"True" was a huge hit on the independent film festival circuit, which led to it becoming a popular "party tape"...it was being dubbed and bootleg copies were being passed around all across the country. One such bootleg made it into the hands of Vinny Warren, an ad exec at the DDB-Needham advertising agency. Budweiser was a client of DDB, so, Vinny approached August Busch IV, CEO of Anheuser-Busch, and sold him on the idea of turning True into a series of TV commercials.

When production began on the commercials, Stone called Brooks and urged him to come to New York for an audition. Brooks was not a professional actor at the time, and this was his first audition. After a week of auditions, and 3 call-backs, Brooks beat out 250 other actors, and was given the lead role of "Dookie." The commercials were shot over 3 days in November 1999 in locations around New York City. For a short while, Brooks continued to work as a bouncer even after the commercials debuted, unaware of how his life was about to change.

== Overnight success ==
Brooks shot to celebrity overnight thanks to the success of the "Whassup" commercials. The campaign ran for over two-years, with at least 11 commercials. The specific popularity of Brooks' character "Dookie" prompted Anheuser-Busch to create several commercials based around his solo adventures.

The New York Times, Washington Post, Newsweek, Vibe, TV Guide, Entertainment Weekly, The New Yorker, People and Forbes, as well as many other magazines and newspapers across the country, all featured articles about the sensation surrounding the commercials. Brooks has also been interviewed or featured on many national & local television & radio shows, including: The Tonight Show, Oprah, Entertainment Tonight, The Today Show, CBS This Morning, Live with Regis and Kathy Lee, The Howard Stern Show, WWF Raw, 48 Hours, Inside Edition, Talk Soup, E! News Daily, VH1's The 25 Greatest, CBS's Super Bowl's Greatest Commercials, TNN's Fame for 15', The 2000 Source Awards, the A&E documentary America's Favorite TV Commercials, and the BBC's television special Best Ads Ever.

To this day, the commercials are routinely featured in magazine articles and television specials as one of the top 10 TV commercials and Super Bowl commercials of all time. The commercials were nominated for an Emmy, won the 2000 Grand Clio Award for Best Campaign and Best Commercial, and "Wasabi" (one of Brooks' solo commercials) won the 2000 Cannes Film Festival Golden Lion Award for Best Commercial in the world. Brooks also won a Best Actor Award from the Black Emmy Association.

== After "Whassup!" ==
After the initial success of the commercials, the "Whassup Guys" signed a development deal with Paramount Television to create and star in a new television series, and became the hosts of ABC's prime time series Best Commercials You’ve Never Seen. Later, Brooks went on to become the solo host of the Best Commercials... series, he also landed a development deal with Banyan Productions, with 2 pilots in consideration by major networks.

In January 2002, Scott called into the Howard Stern show to say that although he was making up to $5000 a night doing appearances at bars, he wanted to do something else before he was only ever known as "The Wassup Guy". Howard told him he should keep doing it until there's no more money, but Scott insisted that he was finished with doing "Wassup Guy" appearances.

Throughout the 2000s, Brooks continued to pursue his acting career, landing several TV and feature film roles, including; UPN's The Parkers, CBS's Hack, Fox's Jonny Zero, New Line Cinema's Dumb and Dumberer and Disney's Mr. 3000. He also continued his commercial career, doing commercials for major brands such as Mcdonald's, The WE Network, and Dodge Truck. Brooks added another popular catchphrase to his resume when he was featured in one of the Dr. Scholl's "Are You Gellin'?" TV commercials. In 2004, Brooks became the voice of Church's Chicken in their television and radio ads. From 2009 - 2010, he was the host of the Verizon-Fios "Home 2.0 Makover Show", a series of promotional infommercials for the company.
