= Vini Flores =

Brazilian futsal player

Personal information
- Full name: Vinícius Hollweg Flores
- Date of birth: 27 December 1984 (age 41)
- Place of birth: Chapecó, Brazil
- Height: 1.80 m (5 ft 11 in)
- Position: Pivot

Team information
- Current team: Campo Mourão
- Number: 14

Youth career
- –2003: AD Colegial

Senior career*
Years	Team	Apps	(Gls)
2004	Santa Fé		
2004	Araçatuba		
2005–2008	AD Colegial		
2009–2010	Floripa Futsal		
2011	Copagril		
2012–2016	Floripa Futsal		
2017–2018	Foz Cataratas	35	(17)
2019	Campo Mourão	45	(14)
2020	ACBF	16	(4)
2021	Marreco Futsal	6	(2)
2021-2023	CR Candoso	46	(23)

International career^{‡}
2018–	Brazil		
- * Club domestic league appearances and goals as of 00:00, 25 May 2019 (UTC) ‡ National team caps and goals as of 00:00, 25 May 2019 (UTC)

Vinícius Hollweg Flores (born 27 December 1984), better known as Vini, is a Brazilian futsal player who plays as a pivot for CR Candoso and the Brazilian national futsal team.
