= DiVincenzo =

DiVincenzo or Di Vincenzo is a surname. Notable people with the surname include:

== Di Vincenzo ==
- Antonio di Vincenzo (1350–1401/1402), Italian architect
- Mattia Di Vincenzo (born 1992), Italian footballer
- Rosario Di Vincenzo (1941–2026), Italian footballer
- Yésica Di Vincenzo (born 1987), Argentine beauty pageant

== DiVincenzo ==
- David DiVincenzo (born 1959), American theoretical physicist
- Donte DiVincenzo (born 1997), American basketball player
- Josie DiVincenzo, American television and film actress
- Joseph N. DiVincenzo Jr. (born 1952), American county executive, Essex County, New Jersey

== See also ==
- DiVincenzo's criteria, conditions necessary for constructing a quantum computer
- Loss–DiVincenzo quantum computer a scalable semiconductor-based quantum computer
- Vincenzo
