= Whassup? =

Advertising campaign for Anheuser-Busch Budwiser beer

Whassup? (also known as Wazzup) was a commercial campaign for Budweiser beer from 1999 to 2002. The first spot aired during Monday Night Football on December 20, 1999 and then in 2000 just after the Super Bowl XXXIV halftime show. The ad campaign ran in much of the world and became a pop culture catchphrase, comically slurring "what's up?".

== Origins ==
The commercials were based on the short film True written and directed by Charles Stone III, featuring Stone and several of his childhood friends: Fred Thomas, Paul Williams, Terry Williams, Jimmy "Puerto Rock" Perez, and Kevin Lofton. The characters sat around talking on the phone and saying "whassup?" to one another in a comical way. Vinny Warren, a creative working on the Budweiser brand at advertising agency DDB Chicago randomly came across the short film TRUE. He liked it and noticed that everyone he showed it to would invariably shout "Wassup!" to him when he met them later. This led him to think that perhaps everyone would have this reaction. He pitched the idea to his boss Don Pogany who presented the concept to August Busch IV, vice president of Anheuser-Busch. Impressed, Busch licensed the idea from C&C Storm films and enlisted Stone as the director for Budweiser TV commercials inspired by the film. Scott Martin Brooks won the role of Dookie when Kevin Lofton declined to audition.

== Accolades ==
Whassup? was awarded the Cannes Grand Prix award and the Grand Clio award, among others. The campaign was inducted into the CLIO Hall of Fame in May 2006.

== Sequels ==
In 2000, Budweiser created a sequel entitled "Whassup Girlfriend" featuring the original cast, with one member watching a program with his girlfriend when his friends call.

In 2001, during Super Bowl XXXV, Budweiser aired two more sequels. One, titled "Whassup Come Home", features an alien who returns to his mothership and is asked what he has learned during his time on Earth, to which he responds, "Whassuuuuuuuuuuup." The other, titled "What Are You Doing?", is a direct parody of the original commercial but instead featuring a cast of yuppies who utter the phrase, "What are you doing?" instead of, "Whassup?"

Eight years after it first aired, Stone rebooted the ad, with the same cast, as Wassup 2000. The two-minute short film was heavily critical of the presidency of George W. Bush and was a clear endorsement of the presidential campaign of Barack Obama. The 2008 video was nominated for the Favorite User Generated Video award at the 35th People's Choice Awards.

In 2020 a new ad campaign "Checking in, that's Whassup" was created by VaynerMedia. Social media spots featured friends meeting on an online platform, a common occurrence during the COVID-19 pandemic. The campaign encouraged viewers to check in with friends, and received a Bronze award from the Clio Sports program.

== "Wassuup!" ==
In October 2000, the British music duo Shaft released a song and video titled "Wassuup!" under the name Da Muttz, referencing the Budweiser ad, set to a sample of "U Can't Touch This" by MC Hammer (which, in turn, sampled Rick James' "Super Freak"). It reached number 11 on the UK Singles Chart, and was also a hit on charts across Europe and in Australia. It was accompanied by a funny music video that parodies 70s disco and the Terminator franchise.

=== Charts ===
==== Weekly charts ====
Chart (2000–2001)	Peak position
Australia (ARIA)	12
Belgium (Ultratop 50 Flanders)	24
Belgium (Ultratop 50 Wallonia)	1
Europe (Eurochart Hot 100)	55
Finland (Suomen virallinen lista)	11
France (SNEP)	2
Germany (GfK)	38
Ireland (IRMA)	20
Scottish Singles Sales (Official Charts)	14
Spain (Promusicae)	8
Sweden (Sverigetopplistan)	17
Switzerland (Schweizer Hitparade)	11
UK Singles (Official Charts)	11

== Cultural influence ==
The campaign was notably parodied in the 2000 comedy horror film Scary Movie.

WWE tag team The Dudley Boyz would notably use the “Whassup” joke during their “Diving Headbutt” signature move going as far back as 2000.

The campaign phrase “Whassup” is featured prominently as a sample and used in the song "그녀를 일으켜라 Get Her Up" by Yoo Young-jin from his 2001 album Agape.

One of the episodes uploaded to the Annoying Orange YouTube channel directly parodies the original commercial.

Thierry Henry famously mimicked the 'Whassup!' in a goal celebration.
