= List of storms named Lan =

The name Lan (Marshallese: ļan̄, [lˠɑŋ]) has been used for two tropical cyclones in the western North Pacific Ocean. The name was contributed by the United States and means storm in Marshallese. It replaced the name Vicente, after it was noted the name appeared on both naming lists for the Western North Pacific and Eastern North Pacific. The name was retired to avoid any potential confusion.

- Typhoon Lan (2017) (T1721, 25W, Paolo) – an intense typhoon that struck Japan, causing $2 billion in damage and killing 17 people
- Typhoon Lan (2023) (T2307, 07W) – a potent typhoon that struck Japan

== See also ==
- Cyclone Lam (2015) – a powerful cyclone with a similar name that struck Australia's Northern Territory

| Preceded by Khanun | Pacific typhoon season names Lan | Succeeded by Saobien |
