= Vins (disambiguation) =

Georgi Vins (1928–1998) was a Soviet religious dissident.

Vins or VINS may also refer to:

- Vins (cartoonist) (1944–2014), Indian cartoonist
- Vermont Institute of Natural Science

== See also ==
- Vin (disambiguation)
- de Vins
