= Vincente =

- Pronunciation: Italian: [vinˈtʃɛnte]
- Gender: Male

Origin
- Origin: Latin
- Meaning: Vincent
- Region of origin: Italy

Other names
- Nicknames: Vin, Vince, Vinny, Vinnie, Cenzo
- Related names: Vincent, Vincenzo, Vicente, Vincentius

Vincente is a given name. Notable people with the name include:

- Vincente Minnelli, American film director and stage director

== See also ==
- Vicente (disambiguation), a Spanish and Portuguese name
