= Associação Campo Mourão Futsal =

Brazilian futsal club

Campo Mourão
- Full name: Associação Campo Mourão Futsal
- Founded: 13 December 2012; 12 years ago
- Ground: Ginásio de Esportes Belin Carolo
- Capacity: 4,500
- Chairman: Miguel Pedro Abudi Júnior
- Coach: Juninho
- League: LNF
- 2022: Overall table: 15th of 22; Playoffs: Round of 16
colours	colours

Associação Campo Mourão Futsal, is a Brazilian futsal club from Campo Mourão founded in 2012 which plays in Liga Nacional de Futsal.

== Current squad ==
As of 24 May 2019

#	Position	Name	Nationality
1	Goalkeeper	Deivd Souza	(Brazil)
8	Winger	Fabrício Carneiro	(Brazil)
9	Pivot	Fabinho	(Brazil)
12	Goalkeeper	Vitão	(Brazil)
14	Pivot	Vini Flores	(Brazil)
15	Defender	Alemão	(Brazil)
18	Winger	Betinho	(Brazil)
19	Winger	Canhoto	(Brazil)
20	Winger	Luíz Souza	(Brazil)
21	Defender	Caio Barros	(Brazil)
28	Defender	Kevin Negão	(Brazil)
30	Winger	Rafael Ernandes	(Brazil)
93	Winger	Nenê	(Brazil)
