= Vinny =

- Gender: Male

Origin
- Origin: Latin nomen Vincent
- Region of origin: Italy

Vinny or Vinnie is a masculine given name, usually a shortened version of Vincent, Vincenzo, Arvin, or Vicente, which may refer to:

== Vincents ==
- Vinnie Anderson (born 1979), New Zealand rugby league footballer
- Vinny Anthony II (born 2003), American football player
- Vinny Appice (born 1957), American rock drummer
- Vinnie Bell (1932–2019), American session guitarist
- Vinnie Clark (born 1969), American former National Football League player
- Vinnie Colaiuta (born 1956), American drummer
- Vincent Cusano (born 1952), stage name Vinnie Vincent, American rock/metal guitarist, formerly with Kiss
- Vinny Del Negro (born 1966), American retired National Basketball Association player and head coach
- Vinnie Doyle (1938-2010), Irish journalist and editor
- Vinny Faherty (born 1987), Irish footballer
- Vinny Guadagnino (born 1987), American reality television personality and actor best known for his appearances on Jersey Shore
- Vinnie Hinostroza (born 1994) American National Hockey League player
- Vinnie Johnson (born 1956), American retired National Basketball Association player
- Vinnie Jones (born 1965), British actor and former footballer
- Vinnie Moore (born 1964), American guitarist and member of the English hard rock band UFO
- Vinny Nittoli (born 1990), American baseball player
- Vincent "Vinny" Parco, star of the reality television program Parco P.I.
- Vinnie Pasquantino (born 1997), American baseball player
- Vinnie Paul (1964–2018), American rock/metal drummer, founding member of the band Pantera
- Vincent Richards (1903-1959), American tennis player
- Vinny Rottino (born 1980), American Major League Baseball utility player
- Vinny Samways (born 1968), English former footballer and manager
- Vinnie Sunseri (born 1991), American National Football League player
- Vinny Testaverde (born 1963), American former National Football League quarterback

== Indeterminate ==
- Vinny Burns (born 1965), English hard rock guitarist and producer
- Vinny Cerrato, National Football League executive and former football player
- Vinny Curran, American actor
- Vinny Curry (born 1988), American National Football League player
- Vinny Finigan (born 1989), English rugby league player
- Vinny Golia (born 1946), American composer and musician
- Vinnie Hacker (born 2002), American influencer
- Vinny Lingham (born 1979), South African Internet entrepreneur
- Vinny Vella (1947–2019), American actor
- Vinny Warren, American advertising creative director best known for his Budweiser "Whassup?" campaign

== Other ==
- Vinicio Vinny Castilla (born 1967), Mexican-born former Major League Baseball player
- Mark Vinnie Dombroski (born 1962), American lead vocalist and main songwriter for the alternative rock band Sponge
- Marvin Vinny Giles (born 1943), American amateur golfer
- Viriato Vinny deMacedo (born 1965), American politician
- Vinicius Vinny Magalhães (born 1984), Brazilian mixed martial artist
- Vincenzo Vinny Paz (born 1962), American former boxer and world champion in several weight classes
- Václav Prospal (born 1975), Czech retired National Hockey League player
- Lavinia Vinnie Ream (1847-1914), American sculptor
- Quoc Al Vinny Vinh, Vietnamese-American professional poker player
- Ventan Vinnie Yablonski (1923-2008), American National Football League player

== Stage name, ring name or pseudonym ==
- Vinny Arora, stage name of Indian television actress born Harmeet Kaur in 1991
- Vinnie Barrett, American songwriter and musician born Gwendolyn Hines Woolfolk in 1945
- Vincenzo Luvineri (born 1977), stage name Vinnie Paz, Italian-American rapper and lyricist
- Vinnie Vegas, a ring name of American retired professional wrestler Kevin Nash (born 1959)
- Vinny (also known as "Vinny Vinesauce"), the pseudonym of member and founder of the Twitch streaming collective Vinesauce

== Fictional characters ==
- Vinnie Barbarino, on the American sitcom Welcome Back, Kotter, played by John Travolta
- Vinny Dingle, on the ITV soap opera Emmerdale
- Vinny Folson, a character in Ninjago
- Vinnie Kruse, on the New Zealand soap opera Shortland Street
- Vinnie Monks, on the BBC soap opera EastEnders
- Vinny Panesar, on the BBC soap opera EastEnders
- Vinnie Terrio, in the cartoon Littlest Pet Shop
- Vinnie Patterson, on the Australian soap opera Home and Away
- Vinny or Vince Wolek, on the American soap opera One Life to Live
- Vinnie, the main antagonist of the video game Grand Theft Auto Advance

== See also ==
- Vinni (disambiguation)
- Vini (disambiguation)
