= Typhoon Lan (2017) =

Pacific typhoon in 2017

Typhoon Lan (Paolo)
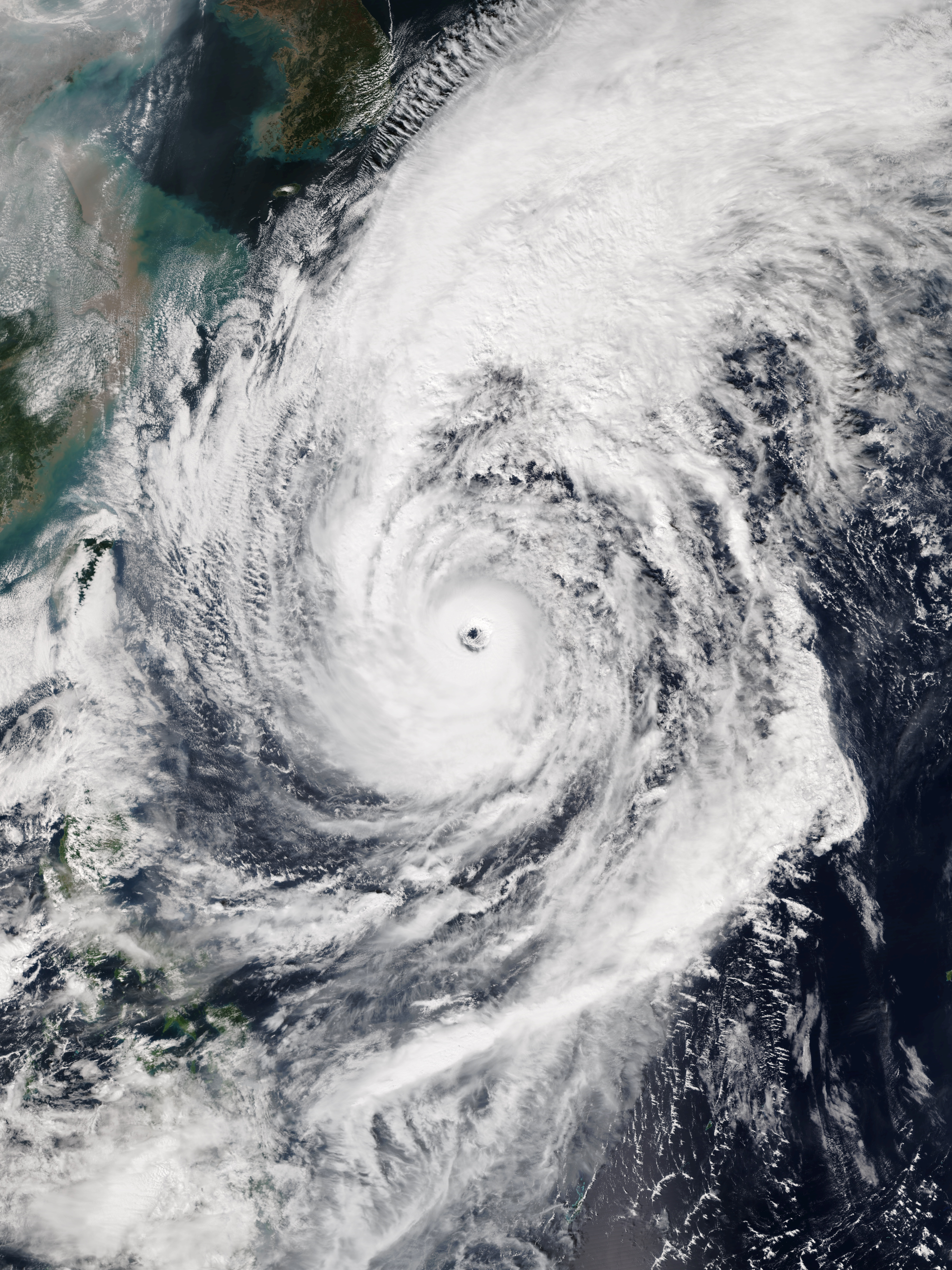
- Typhoon Lan nearing peak intensity south of Japan on October 21

Meteorological history
- Formed: October 15, 2017
- Extratropical: October 23, 2017
- Dissipated: October 24, 2017

Very strong typhoon
- 10-minute sustained (JMA)
- Highest winds: 185 km/h (115 mph)
- Lowest pressure: 915 hPa (mbar); 27.02 inHg

Category 4-equivalent super typhoon
- 1-minute sustained (SSHWS/JTWC)
- Highest winds: 250 km/h (155 mph)
- Lowest pressure: 922 hPa (mbar); 27.23 inHg

Overall effects
- Fatalities: 17 total
- Damage: $2 billion (2017 USD)
- Areas affected: Caroline Islands, Philippines, Japan, South Korea
- IBTrACS
- Part of the 2017 Pacific typhoon season

Typhoon Lan, (Note: The name Lan (Marshallese: ļan̄, [lˠɑŋ]) was contributed by the United States and means "storm, typhoon" in Marshallese.) known in the Philippines as Super Typhoon Paolo, (Note: PAGASA assessed that Lan reached maximum sustained winds of 185 km/h (115 mph), making it a typhoon. However, in March 2022, the agency revised their intensity scale, downgrading the minimum sustained winds for a super typhoon from 220 km/h (135 mph) to just 185 km/h, after the devastating "Super" Typhoon Rai (Odette) struck the country four months earlier. This, effectively, upgraded Lan to a super typhoon, but only in PAGASA's scale.) was the third-most intense tropical cyclone worldwide in 2017, behind only hurricanes Irma and Maria in the Atlantic. A very large storm, Lan was the twenty-first tropical storm and ninth typhoon of the annual typhoon season. It originated from a tropical disturbance that the United States Naval Research Laboratory had begun tracking near Chuuk on October 11. Slowly consolidating, it developed into a tropical storm on October 15, and intensified into a typhoon on October 17. It expanded in size and turned northward on October 18, although the typhoon struggled to intensify for two days. On October 20, Lan grew into a very large typhoon and rapidly intensified, due to favorable conditions, with a large well-defined eye, reaching peak intensity as a "super typhoon" with 1-minute sustained winds of 249 km/h (155 mph) – a high-end Category 4-equivalent storm – late on the same day. Afterward, encroaching dry air and shear caused the cyclone to begin weakening and turn extratropical, before it struck Japan on October 23 as a weaker typhoon. Later that day, it became fully extratropical before it was absorbed by a larger storm shortly afterward.

Lan caused significant impacts in Japan, with over 380,000 evacuations occurring in Japan, and the cancellations of several domestic flights. In total, approximately 17 deaths were attributed to the typhoon, mainly due to flooding from its rainbands. Damage totals were estimated to have been at least US$2 billion (2017 USD), making it one of the costliest typhoons to have struck Japan.

== Meteorological history ==
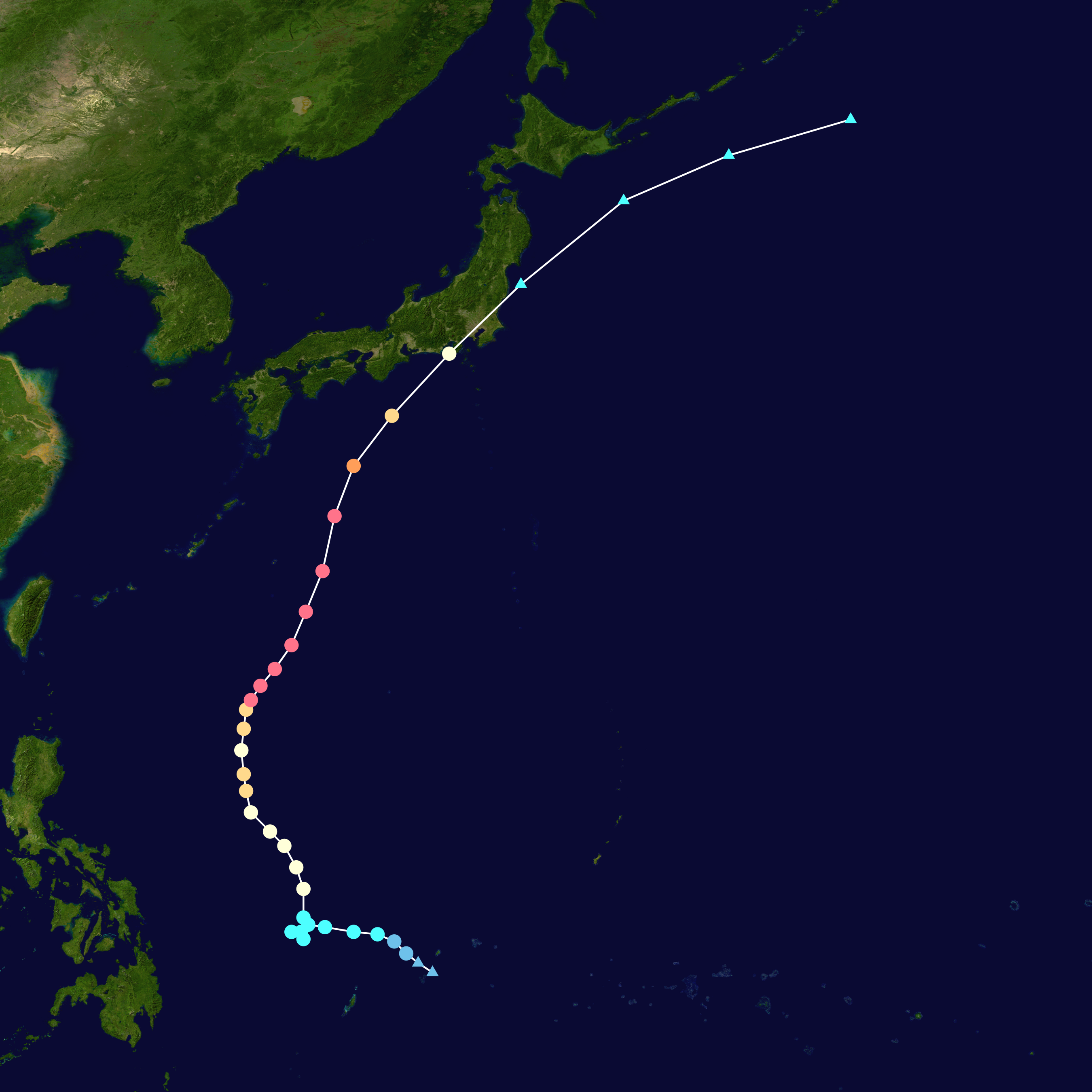
Map plotting the storm's track and intensity, according to the Saffir–Simpson scale Map key Saffir–Simpson scale Tropical depression (≤38 mph, ≤62 km/h) Tropical storm (39–73 mph, 63–118 km/h) Category 1 (74–95 mph, 119–153 km/h) Category 2 (96–110 mph, 154–177 km/h) Category 3 (111–129 mph, 178–208 km/h) Category 4 (130–156 mph, 209–251 km/h) Category 5 (≥157 mph, ≥252 km/h) Unknown Storm type Tropical cyclone Subtropical cyclone Extratropical cyclone, remnant low, tropical disturbance, or monsoon depression

The United States Naval Research Laboratory (NRL) initially mentioned a tropical disturbance over Chuuk on October 11. After the slow consolidation, the Joint Typhoon Warning Center (JTWC) issued a Tropical Cyclone Formation Alert to the elongated system early on October 14, shortly after the Japan Meteorological Agency (JMA) started to monitor it as a low-pressure area. The agency upgraded it to a tropical depression almost one day later and began to issue tropical cyclone warnings since 06:00 UTC on October 15. In the afternoon, the JTWC also upgraded it to a tropical depression assigning the designation 25W, which formative but shallow convective bands had become more organized, and symmetrically wrapped into a defined low-level circulation center. About three hours later, the JMA upgraded it to the twenty-first Northwest Pacific tropical storm in 2017 and assigned the international name Lan, when it was located approximately 310 km (190 mi) to the northeast of Palau. Early on October 16, the JTWC upgraded Lan to a tropical storm based on T-number 2.5 of the Dvorak technique, shortly before it entered the Philippine Area of Responsibility and received the name Paolo from PAGASA.

In an area of low to moderate low vertical wind shear, convection over Lan's center was occasionally displaced, but strong poleward outflow enhanced by a tropical upper tropospheric trough (TUTT) as well as sea surface temperature (SST) over 30°C with high ocean heat content (OHC) contributed to the intensification, resulting in being upgraded to a severe tropical storm by the JMA at around 00:00 UTC on October 17. Soon, the westward system became quasi-stationary due to a weakening subtropical ridge to the north. When Lan developed into the ninth typhoon of 2017 at around 18:00 UTC, it had turned slowly northward under the steering influence of a building steering ridge to the southeast and east. Early on the next day, the JTWC also upgraded it to a typhoon. although it later became partially exposed for a half of day. At 12:00 UTC on October 18, the JMA reported that Lan had become a large typhoon, with a diameter of about 1,310 km (810 mi). Despite favorable conditions, Lan had struggled to intensify for two days, even while growing larger in diameter.

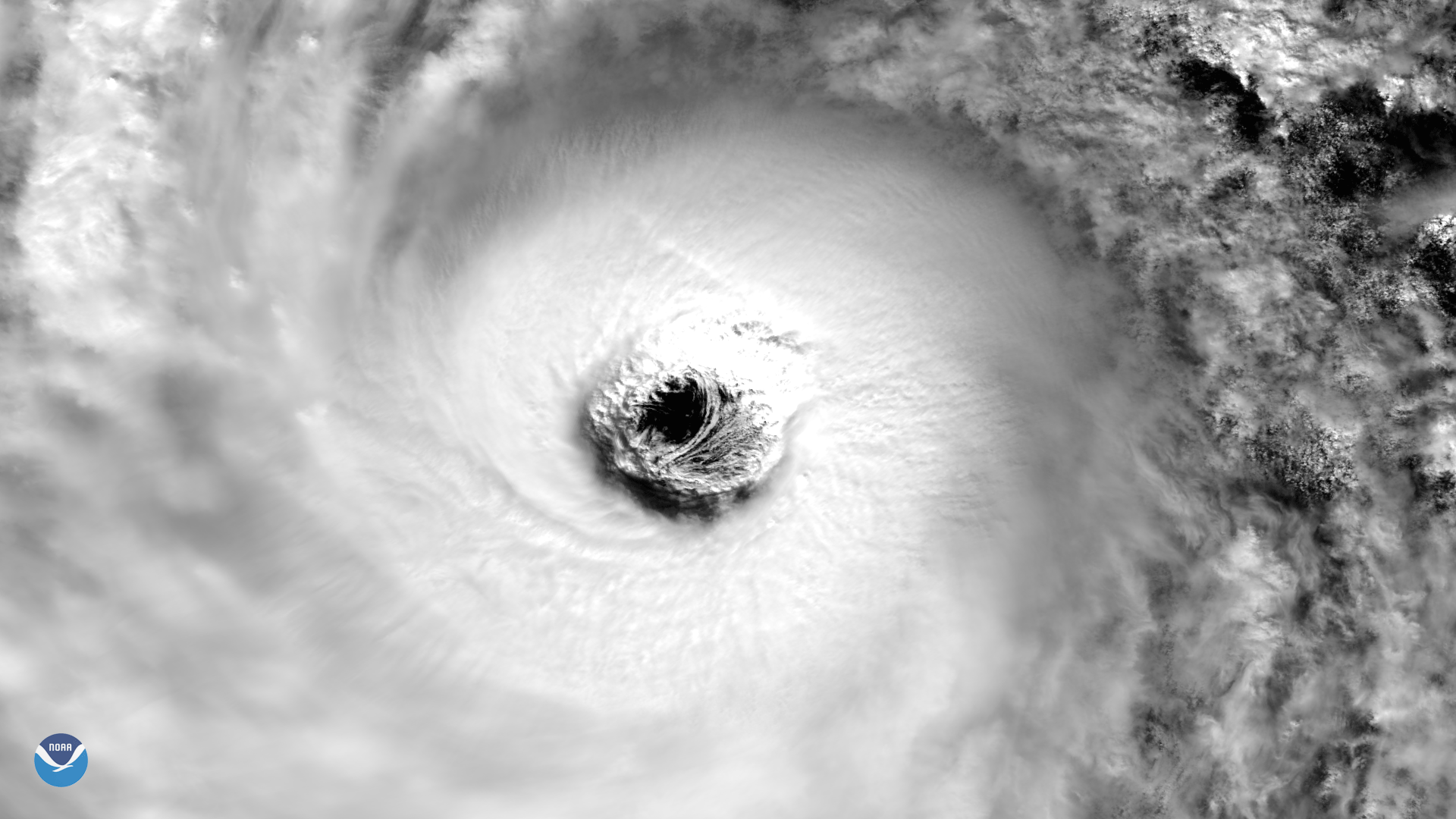
The eye of Typhoon Lan at peak intensity on October 21

Lan started to rapidly intensify thanks to excellent outflow, particularly poleward, which gradually formed a large and symmetric eye with a diameter of 60 mi (97 km). The JMA indicated that the typhoon had reached its peak intensity at around 18:00 UTC, with the central pressure at 915 hPa (27.0 inHg) and ten-minute maximum sustained winds at 185 km/h (115 mph); the JTWC also reported that Lan had intensified into a super typhoon at the same time. Early on October 21, when Lan accelerated north-northeastward along the western periphery of the deep layered subtropical ridge, the JTWC reported that its one-minute maximum sustained winds reached 250 km/h (155 mph), a high-end category 4 of the Saffir–Simpson scale, ranging from T6.5 to T7.0 of the Dvorak technique. For increasing vertical wind shear, Lan began to weaken and undergo the extratropical transition early on October 22 with significant erosion of its eyewall, after maintaining the super typhoon status as well as peak intensity for over one day. Despite excellent poleward outflow tapping into the mid-latitude westerlies over Japan, the satellite imageries revealed cold-air stratocumulus streaming southward over the western semi-circle of the typhoon, which was associated with advection of cooler, drier air. As the result, the once large eye was quickly filled, and Lan was exhibiting frontal characteristics.

At 03:00 JST on October 23 (18:00 UTC on October 22), Lan made landfall over Omaezaki, Shizuoka Prefecture in Japan, with ten-minute maximum sustained winds at 150 km/h (93 mph) and one-minute maximum sustained winds at 165 km/h (103 mph), equivalent to a Category 2 hurricane. At that time, its diameter of gale winds had expanded to approximately 1,700 km (1,100 mi). Three hours later, Lan weakened to a severe tropical storm. Lan entered the Pacific Ocean shortly before 09:00 JST (00:00 UTC) and continued accelerating northeastward within the westerlies, displaying a well-defined frontal structure with an exposed, broad center and rapidly decaying deep convection sheared to the northeast. The JMA reported that Lan had become extratropical at 06:00 UTC, although the JTWC issued a final warning three hours before and even declared an extratropical cyclone about 12 hours earlier. A new extratropical low absorbed the former typhoon late on the same day and explosively intensified into a 934 hPa (27.6 inHg) system east of the Kamchatka Peninsula, on October 24.

== Preparations and impact ==
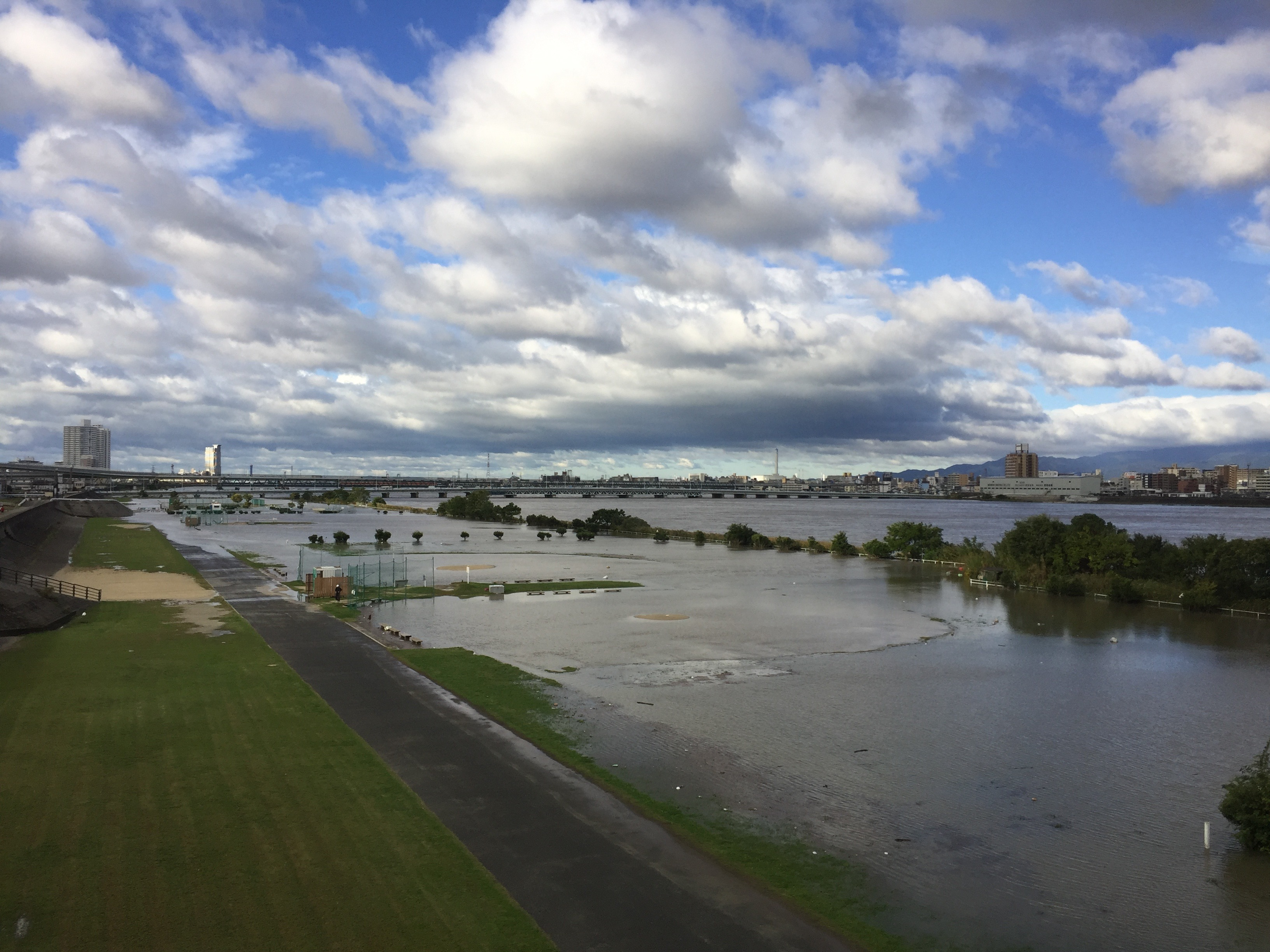
Flooding was a prevalent issue for the Kansai region once the rainbands passed, affecting rivers such as the Yodo River here

Ahead of the storm, approximately 381,000 people were evacuated from their homes. 350 flights were cancelled, with wide destruction to trains and railroads. 80,000 people in Kōriyama were ordered to evacuate their residencies. The typhoon posed danger to close the 2017 Japanese general election, which started close to the forming point. Prime Minister Shinzo Abe told local forces to prepare in case of the storm, as landslide warnings were filed. Ferry service in Japan stopped because of the storm. 2.2 million homes were advised to prepare for evacuation too. During the storm, Shingū, Wakayama recorded a total of 894 millimetres (35.2 inches) in 72 hours, the highest since 2000. In the Osaka Prefecture, a train was forced to brake due to part of the railroad having caved in. The typhoon's remnant moisture boosted the intensity of another extratropical cyclone, which later opened up an atmospheric river, contributing to heavy flooding in Alaska from October 24 to 28. A container ship got stranded by the heavy winds, though the 19 crew members ecsaped unscathed. In total, 17 people were killed in Mainland Japan and the agricultural loss were about JP¥62.19 billion (US$547.9 million). Total economic losses were counted to be US$2 billion. Several hundred homes were inundated. 90 people were also injured.

== See also ==
- Weather of 2017
- Tropical cyclones in 2017
- Other storms of the same name
- Typhoon Tip (1979)
- Typhoon Chaba (2010)
- Typhoon Wipha (2013)
- Typhoon Phanfone (2014)
- Typhoon Noru (2017)
- Typhoon Jebi (2018)
