= Tropical Storm Vicente (2005) =

Pacific tropical storm in 2005

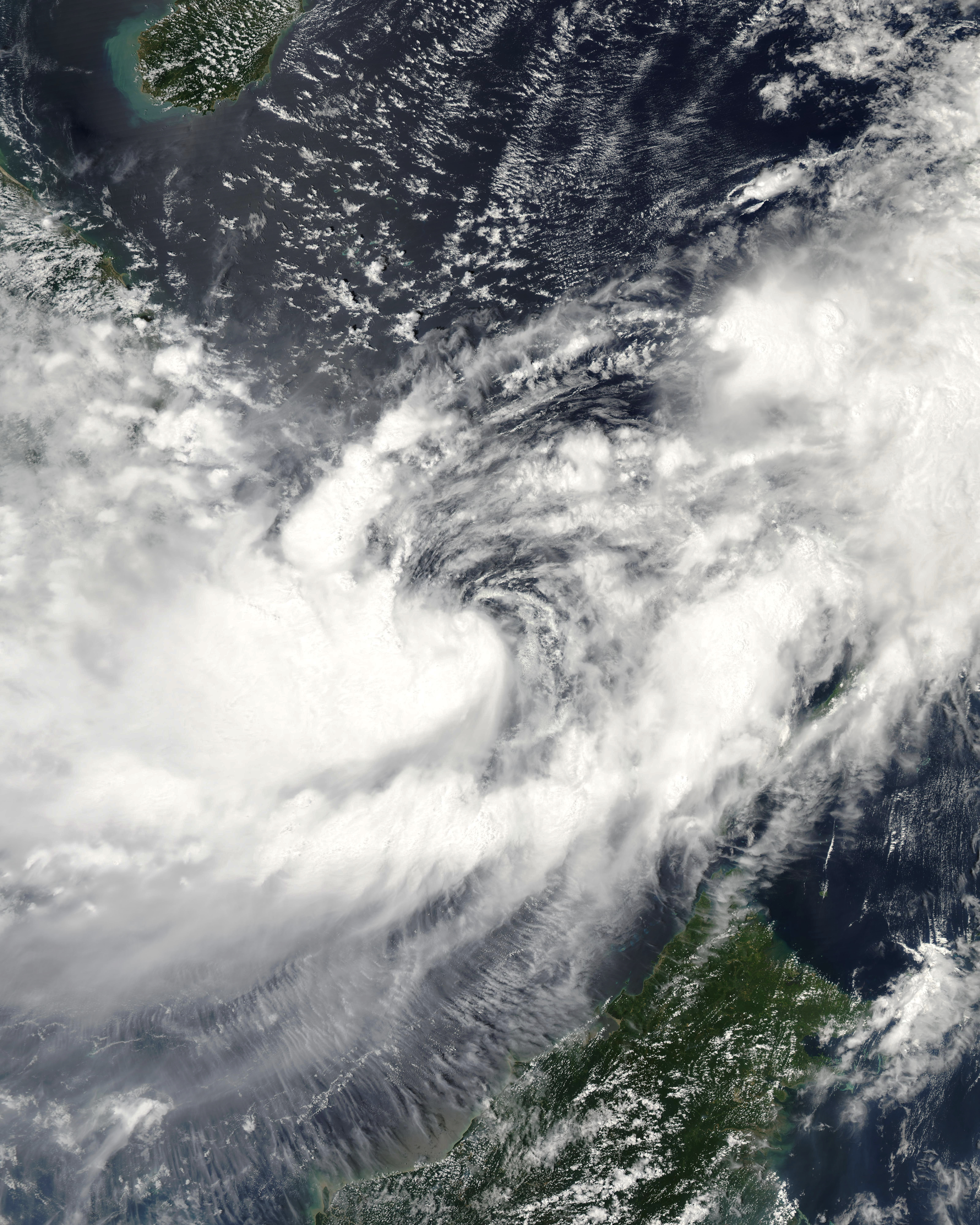
- Vicente on 17 September

Meteorological history
- Formed: 16 September 2005
- Dissipated: 18 September 2005

Tropical storm
- 10-minute sustained (JMA)
- Highest winds: 85 km/h (50 mph)
- Lowest pressure: 985 hPa (mbar); 29.09 inHg

Tropical storm
- 1-minute sustained (SSHWS/JTWC)
- Highest winds: 95 km/h (60 mph)
- Lowest pressure: 989 hPa (mbar); 29.21 inHg

Overall effects
- Fatalities: 22 direct
- Damage: $3.48 million (2005 USD)
- Areas affected: Philippines; China; Vietnam; Thailand
- IBTrACS
- Part of the 2005 Pacific typhoon season

Tropical Storm Vicente (Note: The name Vicente (Chamorro: Vicente, [visente]) was contributed by the United States and is a masculine given name in Chamorro.) was a short-lived but deadly tropical storm which caused severe flooding in Vietnam and Thailand in mid September 2005.

== Meteorological history ==
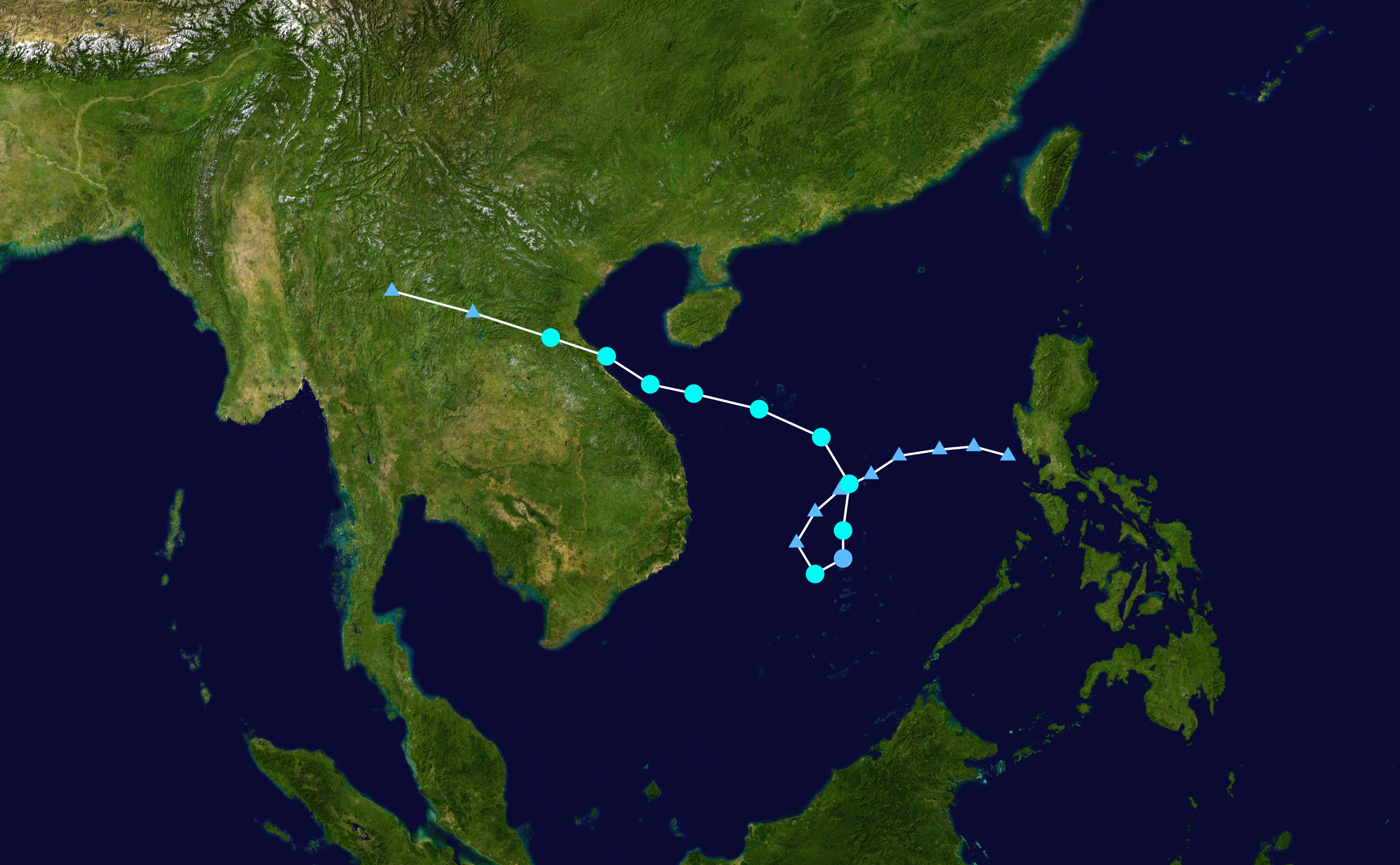
Map plotting the storm's track and intensity, according to the Saffir–Simpson scale Map key Saffir–Simpson scale Tropical depression (≤38 mph, ≤62 km/h) Tropical storm (39–73 mph, 63–118 km/h) Category 1 (74–95 mph, 119–153 km/h) Category 2 (96–110 mph, 154–177 km/h) Category 3 (111–129 mph, 178–208 km/h) Category 4 (130–156 mph, 209–251 km/h) Category 5 (≥157 mph, ≥252 km/h) Unknown Storm type Tropical cyclone Subtropical cyclone Extratropical cyclone, remnant low, tropical disturbance, or monsoon depression

Tropical Depression 16W formed 205 nautical miles (380 km) east-southeast of Dong Tac Airport, Vietnam on the morning of 16 September. It reached tropical storm strength overnight local time and was named Vicente, a Chamorro male name. Shortly after forming, Vicente interacted with a tropical disturbance west of Luzon and made a cyclonic loop. Vicente then absorbed the disturbance before passing just south of Hainan Island. Eventually, Vicente made landfall on the Vietnam coast northwest of Huế on 18 September and gradually dissipated.

== Preparations ==
=== China ===
On 17 September, the Hong Kong Observatory issued a standby signal No.1 as the outer bands of Vicente brought showers and thunderstorms to Hong Kong. The signal was dropped the next day as the storm moved away from Hong Kong. Red flags were hoisted at numerous beaches due to the rough seas.

=== Vietnam ===
Ahead of the storm, about 9,000 residents evacuated inland while others worked to protect the thousands of dykes along the shore.

=== Thailand ===
In anticipation of severe flooding in the capital city of Bangkok, about 2,000 water pumps and 1.7 million sandbags were deployed to prevent significant flooding and to minimize the flooding from nearby rivers. Large forklift trucks were sent to ten stations set up around the city to assist any large trucks which might run into trouble during the storm. An additional 130 smaller forklifts were provided to assist smaller vehicles. A total of seven million sandbags were stockpiled for use around the country.

== Impact ==
=== China ===
Tropical Storm Vicente brought showers and thunderstorms to southern China but had little impact. Rough seas produced by the storm caused the drownings of two swimmers in Ham Tin Wan of Sai Kung. The lowest pressure recorded was 1010.4 hPa (mbar) on September 17. The rough seas also led to a Chinese ship striking a reef. All 17 crew members were rescued.

=== Vietnam ===
Vicente dropped heavy rains throughout Vietnam, notably peaking at 310 mm (12.2 in) in Sơn La, 198 mm (7.7 in) in Tam Đảo District, and 164 mm (6.4 in) in Hòa Bình. Upwards of 150 mm (5.9 in) fell within 30 hours in northern areas of the county. The rains led to increased water levels in the Thao River, which threatened to overflow and flood several villages. In Thanh Hóa Province, an estimated 1,600 homes collapsed and 9,700 dykes were damaged. Large expanses of rice fields were submerged in floodwaters. In Hà Tĩnh Province, a total of 3,500 homes were submerged by floodwaters and an additional 450 residences were evacuated. An additional 3,000 homes were damaged and 250 were destroyed in other areas throughout Vietnam. A landslide in Yên Bái Province killed three people and injured five others. Flooding destroyed a bridge in Duong Quy and inundated a newly built school. A boy in Quỳnh Lưu District was killed when a tree, knocked down by the storm, fell on him. A total of 40,000 hectares (98,842 acres) of farmland was lost due to the storm. Damages totaled to ₫55 billion (US$3.48 million). In all, at least 20 people were killed by the storm.

=== Thailand ===
The remnants of Vicente dropped heavy rains over drought-stricken areas of Thailand. One reservoir, which has a maximum capacity of 8 million cubic metres (282.5 million cubic feet), contained only 312,000 cubic metres (11 million cubic feet) of water. Following the storm, the reservoir gained 288,000 cubic metres (10.1 million cubic feet) of water. At least seven homes were inundated with mud due to the rains in Soi Siang Tai.

== See also ==
- Other tropical cyclones named Vicente
- Typhoon Son-Tinh (2012)
- Tropical Depression 18W (2013)
