= Alberto de' Stefani =

Italian politician and economist (1879–1969)

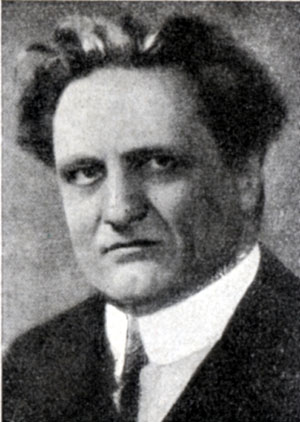

Minister of the Treasury
- In office 22 December 1922 – 10 July 1925
- Prime Minister: Benito Mussolini
- Preceded by: Vincenzo Tangorra
- Succeeded by: Giuseppe Volpi

Ministry of Finance
- In office 30 October 1922 – 10 July 1925
- Prime Minister: Benito Mussolini
- Preceded by: Giovanni Battista Bertone
- Succeeded by: Giuseppe Volpi

Personal details
- Born: 6 October 1879 Verona, Kingdom of Italy
- Died: 15 January 1969 (aged 89) Rome, Italy
- Party: National Fascist Party
- Education: University of Padua
- Occupation: Politician, Economist

Alberto de' Stefani (6 October 1879 – 15 January 1969) was an Italian politician and economist. Coming from a background in liberalism to Benito Mussolini's Italian fascism, De Stefani was in charge of Italian economics from 1922 to 1925. His time in charge was characterized by laissez-faire ideals.

== Minister of treasury ==
De Stefani was appointed by Mussolini as Italy's minister of treasury in December 1922 when Vincenzo Tangorra suddenly died. He was a liberal economist and a former stalwart leader in the Centre Party who favoured policies such as free-trade, tax cuts without too much government interference, and privatisation of businesses such as the communications industry. He also undertook a thorough reform of the taxation system in Italy, which was adjudged a success at the time, although it has been noted that the reforms he enacted had been laid out by his predecessor Filippo Meda but not enacted.

De Stefani took advantage of the dictatorial powers afforded to Mussolini's regime to enact these reforms, which had previously been blocked by parliament, but in exchange he was among the acolytes who continued to serve Mussolini despite being aware of his responsibilities in the Matteotti crime.

The economy prospered under de Stefani's direction, as part of a Europe-wide growth. Both wages and the cost of living fell under his direction. He accomplished his goal of a balanced budget for the financial year 1924–25. By mid-1925, the economy was heading towards crisis and Mussolini dismissed de Stefani, replacing him with Giuseppe Volpi, a corporatist.

== Later political career ==
Although removed from his position as minister de Stefani remained a member of the Grand Council of Fascism until the collapse of Mussolini's regime. From this position, de Stefani often criticised some of the actions of Mussolini's government. He was socially conservative and in 1928 launched an attack on what he felt was the "abundantly liberal" legislation being passed on marriage, arguing that those who chose not to procreate should be denied the same legal rights as parents. He would later become associated with a tendency that included fellow movement veterans Emilio De Bono, Italo Balbo, and Luigi Federzoni that was highly critical of the introduction of Nazi Germany-influenced racial laws into Italy.

== Academic career ==
Away from politics, de Stefani served as a lecturer in economics at the Vicenza Institute of Technology. He later was appointed a professor at the Sapienza University of Rome.
