= Vin =

Vin or VIN may refer to:

== Abbreviations and codes ==
=== Arts, entertainment, and media ===
- Vos Iz Neias?, American Jewish online news site
- Coastal radio station VIN Geraldton (callsign), a station in the former Australian coastal radio service
- VinTV, a Spanish television channel

=== Places ===
- Havryshivka Vinnytsia International Airport (IATA code), Vinnytsia, Ukraine
- Saint Vincent and the Grenadines (IOC country code)

=== Science and technology ===
- Vehicle identification number, unique identifying code for motor vehicles
- Voltage input (V_{in}); for example in a voltage divider or IC power-supply pin
- Vulvar intraepithelial neoplasia, particular changes in the skin of the vulva
- Vinza language (ISO 639-3 code), Tanzania

== Personal name ==
=== Vincent ===
- Vin Baker (born 1971), American basketball player
- Vin Baker (golfer) (died 1990), South African golfer
- Vin Baston (1919–1963), Irish hurler
- Vin Brown (1922–1989), Australian rules footballer
- Vin Campbell (1888–1969), American baseball player
- Vin Coutie (1881–1951), Australian rules footballer
- Vin Di Bona (born 1944), American television producer
- Vin Garbutt (born 1947), English folk singer and songwriter
- Vin Gardiner (1885–1972), Australian rules footballer
- Vin Heffernan (1935–2002), Australian politician
- Vin Mazzaro (born 1986), American baseball pitcher
- Vin Sabbatucci (1935–2007), Australian rules footballer
- Vin Scelsa (born 1947), American radio personality
- Vin Scully (1927–2022), American sportscaster
- Vin Sullivan (1911–1999), American comic book editor, artist and publisher
- Vin Waite (1949–2003), Australian rules footballer
- Vin Weber (born 1952), American politician

=== Other or indeterminate ===
- Vin Abrenica (born 1991), Filipino actor
- Vin Arthur (1905–1970), Australian rules footballer
- Vin Batchelor (1900–1981), Australian rules footballer
- Vin Bhavnani, American basketball coach
- Vin Bruce (born 1932), American Cajun musician
- Vin Catoggio (born 1954), former Australian rules footballer
- Vin Choi (born 1984), Hong Kong actor
- Vin Crowe (born 1946), former Australian rules footballer
- Vin Diesel, stage name of American actor, director, screenwriter, and producer Mark Sinclair (born 1967)
- Vin Doherty (1911–1982), Australian rules footballer
- Vin Doolan (born 1952), former Australian rules footballer
- Vin Gerard (born 1986), American former professional wrestler
- Vin Gordon (born 1949), Jamaican trombone player
- Vin Lananna (born 1953) American track and field coach
- Vin Moore (1879–1949), American film director, actor and writer

=== Fictional characters ===
- Vin, a character in the video games Jak II and Jak 3
- Vin, the primary character in the Mistborn series by Brandon Sanderson
- Vin Gonzales, a Spider-Man/Marvel Comics supporting character

== Other ==
- Vîn TV, Kurdish language satellite television channel

== See also ==
- Vins (disambiguation)
