= CR Candoso =

Portuguese sports club

- Full name: Clube Recreativo de Candoso
- Founded: 20 April 1975; 50 years ago
- Ground: Pavilhão Desportivo do CR Candoso; Guimarães, Portugal
- Chairman: Sérgio Abreu
- Manager: Fabrício Costa
- League: Liga Portuguesa de Futsal
- 2018–19: II Divisão Futsal; Series A: 1st North Zone: 1st Playoffs: Winner

Clube Recreativo de Candoso is a sports club based in the village of São Martinho de Candoso, Guimarães, Portugal. In 2019 the futsal team of Candoso won the Portuguese II Divisão Futsal achieving the promotion to the first tier Liga Sport Zone for the first time in its history.

The club remained in the first division until 2023/24, when it lost the support of its main investor and was eventually relegated. In that final season, Candoso played exclusively with young players from its academy and from lower leagues, all with little experience, and ended up suffering a string of defeats.
