= Vicente =

Vicente is a Spanish and Portuguese name. Like its French variant, Vincent, it is derived from the Latin name Vincentius meaning "conquering" (from Latin vincere, "to conquer").

Vicente may refer to:

== Places ==
- São Vicente, Cape Verde, an island in Cape Verde

== People ==
=== Given name ===
- Vicente Aleixandre (1898–1984), Spanish writer, Nobel Prize laureate
- Vicente Álvarez Travieso, first alguacil mayor (1731–1779) of San Antonio, Texas
- Vicente Aranda (1926–2015), Spanish film director, screenwriter and producer
- Vicente del Bosque (born 1950), former Spanish footballer and former manager of the Spain national football team
- José Vicente Féliz, American settler
- Vicente Fernández (1940–2021), Mexican retired singer, actor, and film producer
- Vicente Fox (born 1942), Mexican politician who served as President of Mexico
- Juan Vicente Gómez (1857–1935), Venezuelan military dictator
- Vicente Gonçalves de Paula (1949–2011), Brazilian footballer
- Vicente Guaita (born 1987), Spanish footballer
- Vicente Guerrero (1782–1831), one of the leading revolutionary generals of the Mexican War of Independence
- Vicente Henriques (born 1978), Brazilian water polo player
- Vicente Lim (1888–1944), Filipino brigadier general and World War II hero
- Vicente Lucas (1935–2026), Portuguese footballer
- Vicente Luque (born 1991), American-born Brazilian mixed martial artist
- Vicente de Paula Neto (born 1979), Brazilian footballer
- Vicente Pérez Rosales (1807–1886), Chilean politician, traveller and colonization agent
- Vicente Rodríguez (born 1981), Spanish international footballer
- Vicente Seguí, (born 1978) Spanish singer winner of "Operación Triunfo" 3rd series in 2003
- Vicente Sotto (1877–1950), Filipino politician
- Tito Sotto (Vicente Sotto III; born 1948), Filipino entertainer and politician
- Vicente Ten (born 1966), Spanish politician
- Vicente Vega (1955–2025), Venezuelan footballer
- Vicente Yáñez Pinzón (c.1460–1523), Spanish navigator, explorer and conquistador

=== Surname ===
- Ana Vicente (1943 – 2015), Portuguese author
- Bruno Leonardo Vicente, (born 1989) Brazilian footballer
- Esteban Vicente (1904–2001), abstract expressionist
- Gil Vicente (1465–1537), Portuguese playwright and poet
- Maria Vicente (born 2001), Spanish athletics competitor
- Mariana Vicente (born 1989), Miss Universe Puerto Rico 2010
- Carlos de São Vicente (born 1960), Portuguese Angolan businessman
- Manuel Vicente (born 1956), Angolan politician
- Nieves García Vicente (born 1955), Spanish chess master
- Vicente (footballer, born 1983) (Wellington da Silva Vicente), Brazilian football left-back

== Other uses ==
- Tropical Storm Vicente, the name used for multiple tropical cyclones in the northern Pacific Ocean

== See also ==
- Vincente (disambiguation)
