= List of storms named Vicente =

The name Vicente has been used for one tropical cyclone in the Eastern Pacific Ocean and for two in the Western Pacific Ocean.

In the Eastern Pacific:

- Tropical Storm Vicente (2018) – formed south of Guatemala and moved towards southwestern Mexico.

In the Western Pacific Ocean:

- Tropical Storm Vicente (2005) (T0516, 16W) – caused severe flooding in Vietnam and Thailand.
- Typhoon Vicente (2012) (T1208, 09W, Ferdie) – a rapidly intensified Category 4 storm affecting the Philippines, Hong Kong, Macau and Guangdong, China.

The name Vicente was retired from use in the Western Pacific after the 2012 season and replaced with Lan.
