= Carlos de São Vicente =

Angolan-Portuguese businessman

Carlos Manuel de São Vicente
- Born: March 16, 1960 (age 66)
- Years active: 1983-2017
- Employer: Sonangol (former)
- Organization: AAA Group (former)
- Criminal charges: embezzlement, tax fraud, money laundering, and influence peddling
- Criminal penalty: Nine years imprisonment plus $4.5 billion fine
- Criminal status: Incarcerated
- Spouse: Irene Alexandra da Silva Neto
- Website: https://carlosdesaovicente.com

Carlos Manuel de São Vicente is a Portuguese Angolan business executive whose career focused on the oil insurance and real estate markets. In 2022, he was convicted of multiple white collar crimes by an Angolan court amidst ongoing anti-corruption efforts by the State.

== Career ==
De São Vicente joined state-run oil company Sonangol in 1983. On April 1, 1999, the same year Manuel Domingos Vicente became president of the Sonangol Board of Directors, de São Vicente convinced the Sonangol board to invest in a 100% stake of Bermuda-registered Mirabilis Insurance Limited, the first of the companies that would soon form the AAA Seguros Group under their parent company, AAA Serviços Financeiros. By 2000, the AAA Group had already finished being set up. De São Vicente became Sonangol's Risk Management Director that same year, a position he would hold until November 2005.

In 2001, a number of new laws reshaped the Angolan oil-insurance industry, particularly Decree-Law 39/01 of June 22, which enabled and mandated Sonangol to engage in risk management such as insurance, Decree-Law 5/01 of August 5, which established Sonangol's monopoly over oil concessions, and Decree-Law 4/01, which placed any financial risk related to Sonangol's operations entirely on the company. This new legislation also removed the insurance monopoly of ENSA, and allowed the company to make AAA Seguros, one of the AAA Group companies, its new sole insurer.

In 2003, Manuel Vicente appointed de São Vicente to Chairman of the Board of Directors of AAA Seguros. That same year, Mirabilis Insurance Limited renamed to AAA Reinsurance Limited. It was also in 2003 that a verbal contract was allegedly established between de São Vicente and Manuel Vicente to gradually transfer ownership of AAA Group, previously wholly owned by Sonangol and therefore the State of Angola, to de São Vicente. This transfer of ownership resulted in Sonangol's share decreasing to only 10%, while de São Vicente's share grew from nothing to 87.89%: a net loss for Sonangol estimated at US$900 million.

== Scandal, trial, and incarceration ==
In 2016, AAA Group's insurance role over the oil industry was revoked by presidential decree citing "allegedly non-transparent management".

In December 2016, Following President José Eduardo dos Santos's decision to not seek re-election, the MPLA chose João Lourenço and not then-Vice President Manuel Vicente as their presidential candidate for the upcoming 2017 Angolan general election. On November 17, 2017, the newly-elected President Lourenço dismissed and replaced the entire Sonangol board of directors.

In 2018, US$900 million belonging to De São Vicente was frozen in Geneva-based Banque SYZ on money laundering suspicions.

On September 21, 2020, de São Vicente was detained by Angolan police. Angolan authorities also seized AAA Group assets including multiple office buildings, thirty-nine hotels, multiple condominiums in the Praia do Bispo neighborhood of Luanda, and a 49% stake in Standard Bank de Angola. His wife called this imprisonment unjust and accused the government and media of "a judicial and media massacre".

De São Vicente lost access to more of his offshore wealth on Feb 19, 2021, when three accounts in the Bank of Singapore containing more than US$558 million, $10.5 million, and $5 million belonging to Carlos, Ivo, and Irene respectively were seized by the Commercial Affairs Department.

On March 23, 2021, the Swiss asset freeze was partially reversed in a final decision by the Federal Supreme Court of Switzerland in Lausanne due to insufficient evidence, despite it having been upheld by a court the previous year. Assets held personally by de São Vicente remained frozen, but AAA Group assets not in his name would be unfrozen.

De São Vicente's trial, originally scheduled to begin on February 1, 2022, was rescheduled to the 4th after a procedural mistake was identified. On its conclusion on March 24, de São Vicente was sentenced to nine years at the Viana Prison in Luanda for embezzlement, tax fraud, money laundering, and influence peddling. He was also ordered to pay a US$4.5 billion fine to the Angolan government.

On November 13, 2023, the United Nations Human Rights Council Working Group on Arbitrary Detention published Opinion No. 63/2023 concerning Carlos Manuel de São Vicente (Angola), which allege violations of de São Vicente's human rights, including denial of access to legal council, lengthy pre-trial detention, and inadequate food and water, crowded conditions, and abuses by other inmates in the Viana prison that were causing a decline in his health. These concerns were echoed by the International League Against Arbitrary Detention, which called for his immediate release.

According to de São Vicente's legal team, he has been entitled to parole since June 26, 2024, but as of 2025 this has been denied. De São's lawyers call this denial of parole unlawful, and his wife calls it abusive.

== Personal life ==
De São Vicente was born on March 16, 1960, and possesses both Portuguese and Angolan citizenship. He is married to Irene Alexandra da Silva Neto, eldest daughter of former Angolan president Agostinho Neto. He has a son named Ivo São Vicente who lives in Lisbon.

== See also ==
- Corruption in Angola
