= Vincenzo Tangorra =

Italian academic and politician (1866–1922)

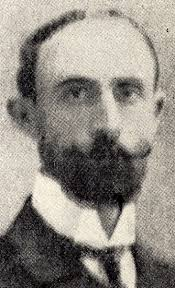

Minister of Treasury
- In office October 1922 – December 1922
- Prime Minister: Benito Mussolini
- Succeeded by: Alberto de' Stefani

Personal details
- Born: 10 December 1866 Venosa, Kingdom of Italy
- Died: 21 December 1922 (aged 56) Rome, Kingdom of Italy

Vincenzo Tangorra (1866–1922) was an Italian academic and politician who served as the minister of treasury between October and December 1922. He worked at the University of Pisa and a member of the Italian Parliament for the People's Party.

== Early life and education ==
Tangorra was born in Venosa on 10 December 1866. He received a degree in commerce in Venice in 1887. In 1890 he also obtained a degree in law in Rome.

== Career ==
Tangorra started his career as an accountant at the General Directorate of Railway Works in Ancona in 1888. From 1892 to 1902 he worked at the University of Rome as a lecturer. He was a faculty member at the University of Pisa between 1902 and 1922. There he worked as professor of finance and financial law. He also worked at the Catholic University of Milan.

After the end of World War I Tangorra joined People's Party and was elected to the Italian Parliament where he served for two terms in the XXV and XXVI legislatures. He was undersecretary at the ministry of the treasury from 4 July 1921 to 26 February 1922 during the first cabinet of Ivanoe Bonomi. In October 1922 Tangorra was appointed minister of treasury to the cabinet led by Benito Mussolini and held the post until his sudden death in December 1922. Italian economist Alberto de' Stefani succeeded Tangorra in the post.

=== Views ===
Tangorra developed a theory of public finance in which he emphasized the significance of the political elements. He further argued that legal principles should be part of fiscal studies.

== Death ==
Tangorra died in Rome on 21 December 1922 while serving as the minister of treasury.
