= Coastal radio station VIN Geraldton =

20th-century telecommunication service in Western Australia

For a more comprehensive treatment with full quotes of newspaper articles refer Wikibooks chapter on VIN Geraldton

The Coastal radio station VIN was a wireless telegraphy coast radio station at Geraldton, Western Australia, which commenced operation on 12 May 1913.

It was the first station in Western Australia constructed by the Commonwealth of Australia. The station VIP Perth / Fremantle / Applecross had commenced previously, but that station had been constructed by the Australasian Wireless Company under contract to the Commonwealth.

The station provided a vital link between VIP and VIZ Roebourne during the daytime (then to VIO Broome and VIW Wyndham and stations further north) and particularly when land telegraph systems failed.

Operationally the station's duties remained relatively constant for several decades, being essentially a communications link between the huge numbers of ships that worked on the Western Australian coastline as well as the mail liners that connected Australia to Europe.

== Organisational changes ==
Organisational control was constantly changing:

- initially a possibly unwanted part of the Postmaster-General's_Department, but with officers professionally classed
- following the commencement of WW1, informally within the scope of the Defence Department
- late in WW1, a reluctant transferee to the Department of the Navy as the Royal Australian Naval Radio Service (RANRS)
- after the conclusion of WW1 transferred back to the Postmaster-General's Department
- in 1922 bought under the control of Amalgamated Wireless (Australasia) Ltd as it increased its grasp of Australian wireless
- in 1928 the hard assets of the coastal radio network formally sold to AWA
- Upon commencement of WW2, again the coastal radio network control vested in the Defence Department
- in 1946 briefly under the control of the PMG
- in 1948 transferred to the newly created Overseas Telecommunications (OTC)

== Precursors ==
In the early 1900s, Geraldton was essentially a port town and saw many vessels both docking at the port and passing nearby on their way to northern Australia and to Europe. But the coastline was not yet well charted and was littered with many small rocky islands and reefs, all of which presented significant danger to the shipping trade. The proprietors of the Geraldton Guardian were well versed in the problem, its pages regularly reporting lost or damaged ships. Equally, with great forethought, they saw the solution to the problem. Following the sad loss of the SS Windsor, in February 1908 they proposed both additional lighthouses and provision of wireless telegraphy stations along the coastline. Still in July 1909, at the time of the arrival at Fremantle of the first wireless-equipped merchant ship (RMS Mantua), the Geraldton Guardian was advocating for a wireless station for Geraldton. In July 1912 the Commonwealth Meteorologist visited Geraldton investigating a number of weather phenomenon unique to the Northwest coast of Western Australia and noted the benefits arising from a wireless station at Geraldton and foreshadowed the establishment of a continent-circling network of wireless stations. The following month, August 1912, John Graeme Balsille, the Commonwealth Wireless Expert formally announced that the Government was proceeding with the establishment of a network of coastal wireless stations and that Geraldton would be one of the initial locations. The Geraldton Guardian waxed lyrical in its announcement later in the month of August 1912 of the proposed establishment of the Geraldton station. In September 1912, Balsillie was comprehensively interviewed by a journalist from "The West Australian" and was advised that, following the completion of the capital city stations, priority was now being given to establishment of the WA coastal stations, indeed that the Geraldton station might be commenced as early as three weeks hence. A few days later, the Sunday Times also interviewed Balsillie who reiterated the short timetable proposed for the Geraldton station. The interview demonstrated Balsillie's straightforward and matter-of-fact manner which is precisely how he proceeded with the establishment of the stations.

== Construction ==
As foreshadowed by Balsillie, initial work soon commenced and the project supervisor W. M. Sweeney arrived in Geraldton at the end of September 1912 and quickly identified the Residency site on Francis street as being the most suitable. Evidently local council was so keen to see the station established that no opposition was raised to the use of the prime site, and materials were already being delivered on site in the first week of December 1912. Construction of the station was proceeding apace towards the end of December 1912 with a team of eight carpenters constructing the 180 foot mast, 21 inches square consisting of Oregon planks steel bolted together. A further interview with Sweeney was published in the Geraldton Express a few days later which provided further detail of the overall construction and layout of the station. It noted that Sweeney was being assisted on site in wireless matters by Mr. Cox and that the mechanical aspects of the construction were being oversighted by Mr. R. D. Munson of the Public Works Department. Early in January 1913, the Geraldton Express noted that work by the Public Works Department was proceeding satisfactorily and estimated that the buildings would be complete in about three weeks' time. Mid January 1913, the new Peak Hill-Nullagine telegraph line was announced as being in service, which led to consideration of the unreliability of the old line & potential risks remaining with the new line. But it was noted that the coastal radio chain being established provided a key alternative route in case of emergencies. When the coastal chain of wireless stations was first announced, the necessary total number of stations was thought to be about 30, being almost every major port in the nation. But as commissioning proceeded, it became clear that the reliable range for the lower power stations was greater than expected. Carnarvon, about 450km North of Geraldton had been nominated as a likely site, but on 11 January 1913 it was announced that Carnarvon would not be established since Geraldton would be able to service Carnarvon's requirements (in conjunction with the land telegraph system). In February 1913, a few months after the fact, the Commonwealth Gazette announced the purchase of Bullivant's Patent Flexible Steel Wire and Bullivant's Galvanized Wire Rigging Rope for VIN as necessary for antenna and mast rigging. In March 1913, further rigging wire was announced as having been purchased for Station VIN. By mid-January 1913, the jury mast essential to raising the transmitting mast had arrived at Geraldton on the Minderoo and that task was set to commence in a matter of days.

The main mast was raised to the perpendicular on 18 January 1913. The activity in the heart of the town was a visual spectacle that was not equalled for many years and a number of townsfolk turned out to observe (as reported by the Geraldton Guardian). The report of the activity by the Guardian Express emphasised the nautical flavour added by the eight man sailor gang doing the hard lifting with a liberal spread of maritime dialect as the work progressed: "Brace up the top guy"; Ay! Ay! Sir!; "Ho! Ho! Boy!"; "Make fast"; and finally the mast was "Four square to all the winds that blow." The demands on Sweeney's time and resources did not abate but rather increased as the Government relented to local representations and prioritised the Wyndham station for completion also. Sweeney had to juggle available staff and problems with availability of the necessary oregon timbers began to emerge. By mid-February 1913 the mast and buildings were complete. While the transmitting apparatus was not operational, the receivers were installed and reception was obtained from the Perth coastal station and two ships in Fremantle port. In March 1913, the PMG's Department called for tenders for the supply of 2,500 gallons of petroleum for station VIN. This would be a continuing requirement for many years until Geraldton had its own electricity supply and the station could be serviced. The transmitter and all equipment for the station was provided by a 15-h.p. "Gardner" Oil Engine, direct coupled to a "Westinghouse" D.C. Generator. The unit was purchased from Noyes Bros. (Melbourne) Propty. Ltd., 499-501 Bourke-street, Melbourne for an amount of £285, as announced in the Commonwealth Gazette of 14 June 1913. There was some competition between the various crews erecting the masts and stations. The record set by the Geraldton crew for mast erection did not last long, being announced on 30 March 1913 as broken by the Esperance team with a time of 5½ hours, though the latter mast was only 160 ft. high, compared to 180 ft. for the Geraldton mast. There had been little progress when two months later in mid-April 1913 it was advised that the promised transmitter still had not been despatched from the Shaw Wireless Works and was still "undergoing testing" in Sydney. With little more to do pending the arrival of the transmitting apparatus, Sweeney returned to Perth on 4 April 1913. Finally in early May 1913 the transmitter and ancillaries arrived on the Aeon and completion commenced in earnest. On 10 May 1913 it was reported that the transmitter had tested successfully on site and official commencement was imminent. On 12 May 1913, a brief report in the Geraldton Express stated simply that "Wireless.— The wireless station is now ready for public work." The following day the rate of progress in the coastal radio network was well illustrated. When announcing the commencement of the Geraldton station it was also stated that VIR Rockhampton would commence in three days' time, while VIC Cooktown and VIE Esperance would commence the following week.

== Initial operation ==
Two days after commencement of the station, it was operating commercially, with an underwhelming volume of traffic. Local A. H. du Boulay had the honour of lodging the first commercial radiogram and was rewarded two hours later with a reply from the RMS Malwa. An increase in business volume was foreshadowed following enactment of the Navigation Act. It was noted that VIN appeared to be able to receive ships south of VIP somewhat better than VIP itself. The Commonwealth Gazette of 19 July 1913 advertised vacancies for Officers-in-charge for 12 coastal stations outside the major metropolitan centres. The positions were in the Professional Division following advice by Balsillie and generally reflected superior pay and conditions compared to other telegraphists in the Department. Following the exciting times of station construction and initial operation, ordinary life soon set in and in October 1913 a local resident was complaining about the fire risk of long grass in the station paddock. Towards the end of January, Mr. Lamb, officer in charge of the Geraldton Wireless Station was reported returning from his holiday. In May 1914, Mr. Lamb concluded his period as officer-in-charge of the Geraldton station and was transferred to VIP Perth. He was replaced by Mr. Mortimer.

== World War I ==
On 3 August 1914 the Minister for Defence notified the imposition of censorship on all radiotelegraphic traffic within the Commonwealth. Following the commencement of World War One in August 1914, the local authorities were quick to point out that the wireless station was both a key target and quite defenceless. A few days later the Geraldton Mayor advised that the WA Premier had communicated to him that the matter of protection of the wireless station had been referred to the military authorities. On 18 August 1914 Lieut. Gibbings received instructions to mount a guard at the wireless station consisting of one officer and 20 men. Unfortunately the military reserve utilised for guard duty were mostly youthful and not fully convinced of the seriousness of their task. Within a week of commencement their shenanigans drew comment in the Geraldton Express. Within a few weeks the station guard had cause to draw bayonets and an intruder was apprehended at the station. Under questioning at the local court it became clear that the culprit was having a psychotic break and he was remanded for medical assessment. Generators supplied power to the station, but these were typically used primarily to charge a bank of batteries for actual equipment operation. Maintaining battery charge was an ongoing issue and significant supplies of sulphuric acid were required to achieve this. A single tender in September 1914 called for 2,490 lbs of sulphuric acid across 10 stations. By November 1914 it became clear that the number of persons at the station was causing a sanitary problem and the matter was brought to the attention of council. Lieut. Everett, the commanding officer of the station guard, sought to keep his men engaged and participation in local sports events were regularly reported. In February 1915, Commander of the guard (Lieut. E. S. Everett) departed for the Osborne School of Instruction and was replaced by Second Lieut. Hutton. On 27 January 1915 Arthur McDonald of the wireless station staff married local girl Rose Ethell at St. John's Church, Geraldton. In March 1915, Mark Mortimer was appointed as Officer-in-Charge at the Geraldton wireless station. Again in April 1915, the tom-foolery of the young guards was cause for comment in the Geraldton Express. The staff of the wireless station recognized their community responsibilities and in April 1915 donated £2 9s. to the Moore Benefit. The brief return to Geraldton in April 1915 of local boy Lieut. Gibbings on leave from the war was cause for joy and direct news of the war in several arenas in the town.

Application of the War Precautions Act resulted in minimal news of the wireless stations themselves, but Broome's "Nor' West Echo" took a broad interpretation and reported on how a merchant ship was able to evade the Emden thanks to news of its movements broadcast by the Broome station. With the sinking of the Emden, the German threat to the Northwest coast was greatly diminished and early in May 1915 it was announced that the wireless guard to the Geraldton wireless station would be demobilised. Two of the wireless station staff, Pell and Hooker, volunteered for war service in June 1915 and were expected to depart the station shortly. A few weeks later it was reported that A. E. Pell would be departing on 9 July for training at the Blackboy Hill camp and thence to the Wireless Troop in Melbourne. Hooker was to follow as soon as a relieving officer was available. A. E. Pell was replaced early in July 1915 by Mr. Broomhill. In September 1915 both A. E. Pell and B. Hooker, having joined the service were still at the signallers camp at Broadmeadows, Victoria training new recruits in the art of wireless telegraphy. The Commonwealth Gazette of 31 August 1916 noted that Clement George Benger Meredith was now the Wireless station Officer-in-Charge.

== Royal Australian Naval Radio Service ==
The transfer of officers and staff from the Wireless Branch of the Postmaster-General's Department to the Department of Navy was not supported by the personnel. Issues were a loss of professional status, modest loss of pay, loss of general terms and conditions of service and being subject to military discipline. In June 1916 a large deputation of staff met with the Minister for the Navy to air their grievances. In September 1916 A. E. Pell recounted his war experiences by letter to a local friend, noting that after 6 months in Melbourne as a wireless instructor he had been sent to Persia and was presently in a Bombay hospital recovering from fever. A sad and brief report in March 1917 was to effect that Corporal W. Pass, formerly of the wireless station guard had made the ultimate sacrifice in France. The Commonwealth Gazette of 6 September 1917 announced the abolition of the position of Officer-in-Charge, Geraldton wireless station, Postmaster-General's Department (together with all other positions associated with the coastal radio network), associated with the transfer of control to the Royal Australian Naval Radio Service. After much debate and prevarication, the Royal Australian Naval Radio Service was finally created in March 1917 as part of an overall restructure of the Navy, following on from the review by the Naval Board. As a result all pertinent staff of the PMG were transferred to Department of the Navy's RANRS. In August 1917 the impact of the war on the Western Australia coast was diminishing and domestic matters assumed greater attention. Odd noises emanating from the vicinity of the wireless station were variously attributed to secret activities therein. Further enquiry revealed that the offending noise from the wireless station was simply a nearby failing windmill. Another former member of the wireless station guard, Private George Compton, gave the ultimate sacrifice in July 1918.

== Post World War I ==
Mr H. Selfe, was reported as being on the Wireless Station Staff. The Royal Australian Navy Radio Service was formally disbanded on 28 October 1920. The appointments of all the officers were terminated.

== PMG control resumes ==
The Commonwealth Gazette of 21 April 1921 announced a partial restructure of the Radiotelegraph Branch including the abolition of the position of Radio Station Master, Geraldton.

== AWA control ==
Amalgamated Wireless (Australasia) was never reticent in claiming records and exceptional performance, and a December 1922 report advised of a record daytime reception by the Geraldton station of the SS Katoomba at sea of over 1100 miles. In June 1923 the Geraldton station was the first to receive messages concerning the loss and subsequent search for the Trevassa. In fact, those first reports from the Geraldton station about the loss of the Trevassa were initially doubted in Perth. But the arrival of the SS Moreton Bay at Fremantle, the ultimate source of the initial reports, quickly dispelled those doubts. Mr. Reginald Charles Goodland was on the staff of the station in 1924 and 1925, then returned to the Perth station. He passed in an accident near VIP and this news was received with sadness by his many friends Geraldton. By the 1920s Australia's capacity for weather forecasting and reporting had greatly improved. The northwest coast of Western Australia regularly saw intense cyclone activity during the summer months of the southern hemisphere and the coastal radio network played a vital role in distributing weather information to coastal shipping. In the April 1926 cyclone, the Geraldton station served both to broadcast weather information from the Weather Bureau to coastal shipping and to collect weather reports from shipping in the region to assist the Bureau in their forecasting and reporting. A secondary role for the coastal radio network was as an emergency alternative telegraphic route when the land telegraph system sustained damage. This occurred in July 1926 when land telegraph lines along coastal Western Australia were severely damaged by storms and the Geraldton wireless station became a vital link in the telegraphic network. The Geraldton station operated with power from its own diesel generator for more than 13 years. Finally the local electricity supply had expanded to the point where it could support the station and it was connected to the town grid in November 1926.

== Sale of Station to AWA ==
On 2 November 1928 the prospect of agreement by the Commonwealth government to the sale of the coastal radio network to Amalgamated Wireless (Australasia) Ltd. was cause for the firm to postpone its annual general meeting by one month. The Commonwealth Gazette of 8 November 1928 formally detailed the sale of the coastal radio network to Amalgamated Wireless (Australasia) and listed 17 Australian and 9 Pacific stations. The following week it was formally announced that all of the Australian and Pacific Island stations of the coastal radio network including the cornerstone Applecross station had been sold to AWA for an amount of £39,574. It was confirmed that this was in accordance with the original 1922 agreement between the Commonwealth and AWA. A further statement again detailed the specific list of stations with 17 services in Australia (including the Geraldton station) and a further 9 in the Pacific Islands. The stated reason for the sale was that the stations are no longer required by the Federal Government for any public purpose, but that where necessary, army reservations set out in the Crown grants were withheld. George Franklin Cook had spent some years at the Geraldton wireless station circa 1927, but returned to Fremantle circa 1928. In February 1929 he was gathering firewood with his brother and fell from a tree, sustaining serious injuries. He died at the Fremantle hospital some weeks later. The Abrolhos Islands off the coast of Geraldton displayed both extreme natural beauty and horrific risk to coastal navigation. To explore the possibilities for tourism, Geraldton council despatched a party to visit the islands for ten days in June 1929. Harold Cox was the senior wireless officer at the Geraldton wireless station and accompanied the group, providing wireless communication facilities. AWA dominated the market in Australia for wireless fitout on ships in the late 1920s, and in June 1929 at the time of the maiden voyage of the "Westralia," provided a comprehensive summary of its work undertaken which included coastal radio equipment, lifeboat equipment and broadcast band repeaters. Daylight communication with the Geraldton station was established at distance ranging from 800 to 1000 miles.

== Station modernised ==
By late 1930 the work of the wireless station had expanded to the point where building additions were required and these were approved by council in September 1930. The original 180 ft. timber mast which had served the station faithfully for more than 17 years was by the end of 1930 no longer economically maintainable. It was finally lowered on 6 November 1930. Operation at the station was maintained using a temporary mast for several days until a replacement steel mast was installed the following week. The new mast was of tubular steel and a telescopic design. Despite the improvements in technology over the years, the process of raising the mast using a jury mast and winch was closely similar to the task undertaken in 1913. The work was undertaken by supervising project engineer Sydney Trim and mechanic S. Broomehall. The Marconi School of Wireless was a significant part of the AWA wireless combine and played a major role in training interested individuals for future roles in the Navy and military, as well as wireless operators for shipping and coastal stations, also broadcasting. In more remote areas such as Geraldton, the local coastal station participated in the recruitment and tuition of its students. In February 1931, the wireless station was added to the Council's rate book, no doubt as a result of the change of ownership of the property. In March 1931 there was a change in senior staffing at the wireless station. Mr. H. E. Cox, the officer in charge for some years departed for Sydney. His duties were assumed by Mr. E. H. Smellie who had been at Geraldton for about one year, while Mr. H. B. Wolfe was to assume Smellie's former duties in short order. Sydney Trim, the AWA engineer charged with renovating and upgrading the coastal radio network, returned to Sydney in July 1931 after a two year journey circumnavigating Australia visiting most of the coastal stations. Trim had oversighted the replacement of the VIN mast in November 1930 during that tour. Other projects included VIO Broome (replacement mast, replacement 5kW main transmitter & new emergency transmitter), Cockatoo Island (new wireless telephony system), VIN Geraldton (replacement mast, replacement 2kW main transmitter and new emergency transmitter), VIE Esperance (replacement mast and replacement 2kW main transmitter), VID Darwin (replacement mast, replacement 5kW main transmitter and new emergency transmitter), VIA Adelaide (replacement masts, complete station refurbishment) and VIP Fremantle / Perth (new police communications system). Wolfe's recent arrival was confirmed in July 1931, noting he had previously been at VID Darwin for 3½ years and was much appreciating the change in climate.

AWA had rather recently expanded its sphere of operations beyond solely manufacture and retail of broadcast transmitters into ownership and control of individual broadcast stations. 4TO Townsville was to be the newest addition to the group, commencing in October 1931. Harold Cox, recently senior wireless officer at the Geraldton station had been successful in being appointed chief engineer at 4TO. Newman Pusey had been on staff at the wireless station for several years, but in July 1933 received notice of his transfer to VII the Thursday Island station. He was to marry in August 1933 and depart for the north shortly afterwards. It was announced in October 1933 that E. H. Smellie, after some 3½ years at the Geraldton station, had been transferred to VIO Broome and would depart the station in the following month. The coastal radio stations provided generally excellent alternative communication lines during outages of the land telegraph system. But Murphy's law could come to bear and during an outage near Coolgardie in April 1935, when Geraldton wireless was called to assist, it was found that that station itself was unavailable due to a battery recharge being underway. The Geraldton wireless station was fully integrated into the post office telegraphy network which in September 1935 included some 160 stations and 800 substations linked by over 13,000 miles of landlines. The ability to communicate directly with VIP Perth, 24 hours a day, provided invaluable redundancy with the landline network and this capacity was only matched by one other coastal radio station being VIE Esperance. The location of the wireless transmitter within the body of the town was certain to cause blanketing interference to local broadcast receivers due to high levels of radiofrequency signals. But the people of the town seemed to accept the interference as a necessary consequence of this vital service. The residents were less tolerant however of the electrical interference resulting from unsuppressed electrical motors in the town and the matter was raised at a Council meeting in March 1936. In July 1938 it was announced that VIO Broome and VIN Geraldton had been fitted with higher power main transmitters. Stated reason was to improve communication between Broome and Perth at times of land telegraph outages, however better communication in the event of war would also have been a factor.

== World War II ==
Even prior to the declaration of World War 2 in September 1939, the Geraldton militia mounted a guard at the wireless station, emphasising its strategic importance. Security at VIN Geraldton was further enhanced in January 1940 by the passing of the National Security Act which imposed severe penalties for, inter alia, photographing or sketching wireless installations. In August 1940 Mr. R. C. Anderson, wireless officer at VIN Geraldton for the previous four years, received advice of promotion to officer-in-charge of VIO Broome and was to leave Geraldton the following month. December 1940 saw the arrival of C. Lemmon at VIN, having transferred from VIO Broome and he quickly became involved in community activities in Geraldton. The years 1941 through 1944 saw a dearth of information in contemporary publications due to the application of the National Security Act, but increased in mid-1945 as Japanese forces were finally pushed back. Prime Minister Chifley was particularly proud of the part Western Australia played in its defence and again developments in coastal radio were singled out for praise. It was noted that the Geraldton station maintained communications with coastal shipping as well as broader monitoring duties.

== OTC ==
In February 1947 the Overseas Telecommunications Commission (Australia) assumed control of all external telecommunications services previously operated by Amalgamated Wireless (Australasia) Ltd. This included the entire Australian coastal radio network. From June 1948, the Geraldton station was the key station in a radiocommunications network with 4 smaller stations located at different islands in the Abrolhos Islands. The network was to assist exchange of messages of both a commercial and personal nature with the mainland. The Mangrove Island station of the Abrolhos Island network proved invaluable when the Starling ran aground in Whales Bay in October 1950. Enabling communication with the mainland and rendering of emergency assistance upon his return to Geraldton.

== Participants and staff ==
=== Design, construction, maintenance ===
- John Graeme Balsillie, 1913, Commonwealth Wireless Expert who designed the wireless system deployed and oversighted the network establishment
- Walter Moss Sweeney, 1913, construction project supervising engineer for the Postmaster-General's Department
- R. C. Cox, 1913, assistant project engineer for the Postmaster-General's Department
- R. D. Munson, 1913, project foreman-rigger for the Public Works Department's portion of the construction project
- Sydney Trim, 1930, mast replacement project supervising engineer for Amalgamated Wireless (Australasia) Ltd.
- S. Broomehall, 1930, mast replacement project mechanic for Amalgamated Wireless (Australasia) Ltd.

=== Station staff ===
- James Joseph Wiseman Lamb, senior wireless officer, March? 1913 to May 1914
- Mark Mortimer, senior wireless officer, May 1914 to ??
- Arthur McDonald, wireless officer, circa January 1915
- A. E. Pell, wireless officer, ?? to July 1915 (leave for war service)
- B. Hooker, wireless officer, ?? to August 1915 (leave for war service)
- Broomhill, wireless officer, July 1915 to ??
- H. Selfe, wireless officer, circa May 1920
- Louis Alfred Fontaine, wireless officer, circa Jun 1923
- E. W. Tymms, wireless officer, circa April 1925
- Reginald Charles Goodland, wireless officer, January 1924 to December 1925
- George Franklin Cook, wireless officer, circa 1928
- Harold E. Cox, senior wireless officer, circa 1929 to March 1931
- Newman Dobson Pusey, ??, 1926 to August 1933
- E. H. Smellie, wireless operator, 1930 to March 1931; senior wireless operator, March 1931 to November 1933
- H. B. Wolfe, wireless operator, March 1931 to ??
- F. H. Chrismas, senior wireless officer, circa November 1935 to May 1949+
- R. C. Anderson, wireless officer, circa September 1936 to September 1940; relief January 1949 to May 1949
- C. Lemmon, ??, December 1940 to ??

=== Station guard WW1 ===
- Second Lieut Gibbings, guard commander August 1914 to ??
- Second Lieut E. S. Everett, guard commander ?? to February 1915
- Second Lieut Hutton, guard commander February 1915 to ??
- Corporal W. Pass, guard troop, died France February 1917 "no greater love"
- Private George Compton, guard troop August 1914 to January 1915, died France July 1918 "no greater love"
- H. H. Opie, guard commander ?? to ??
