= Vinzenz Fux =

Austrian musician and composer (1606–1659)

Vinzenz Fux (Vincenzio Fuxio), (c.1606–1659) was an Austrian musician and composer.

Fux was born in Weißkirchen, Styria, and was employed as the organist of the church Maria am Gestade in Vienna before he joined the chapel of Eleonora Gonzaga, widow of Holy Roman Emperor Ferdinand II. Fux mainly composed Masses and trio sonatas, which have survived in manuscripts. It is testimony of their high quality that they were even taken at times for works of the later imperial chapelmaster Johann Joseph Fux, who was however not related to Vinzenz Fux. The Kroměříž music archive is the major source of musical compositions by Vinzenz Fux.

Vinzenz Fux died in Vienna, in his early fifties.

== Selected compositions by Fux ==
- Justorum animæ: 2 Chori, 2 Violini, 3 Viole, Basso continuo
- Litaniæ Beatæ Mariæ Virginis: S solo, SATB in cappella, Violino, 3 Violæ, Basso continuo
- Missa S. Xaverii: 8 voci in concerto, 2 Trombettæ ad libitum, 2 Cornetti, 2 Violini, Viola, 5 Tromboni, Fagotto, Basso continuo (1645/49)
- Missa S. Ignatij: SSAATTBB, 2 Violini, 4 Viole, 2 Trombettæ, 2 Cornetti, 4 Tromboni, Viola da gamba, Violone, Organo (dated August, 1668)
- Missa Augusta: 8 voci, 2 Violini, 2 Cornetti, 4 Tromboni (parts missing)
- Missa à. 7. in honorem S. a Barbaræ: SSATB, 2 Cornettini, Organo (dated 1671)
- Canzon pro tabula à 10: 2 Cornetto, 2 Violini, Viola, 3 Tromboni, Organo
