= Vinny, Astrakhan Oblast =

Vinny Винный
- Settlement
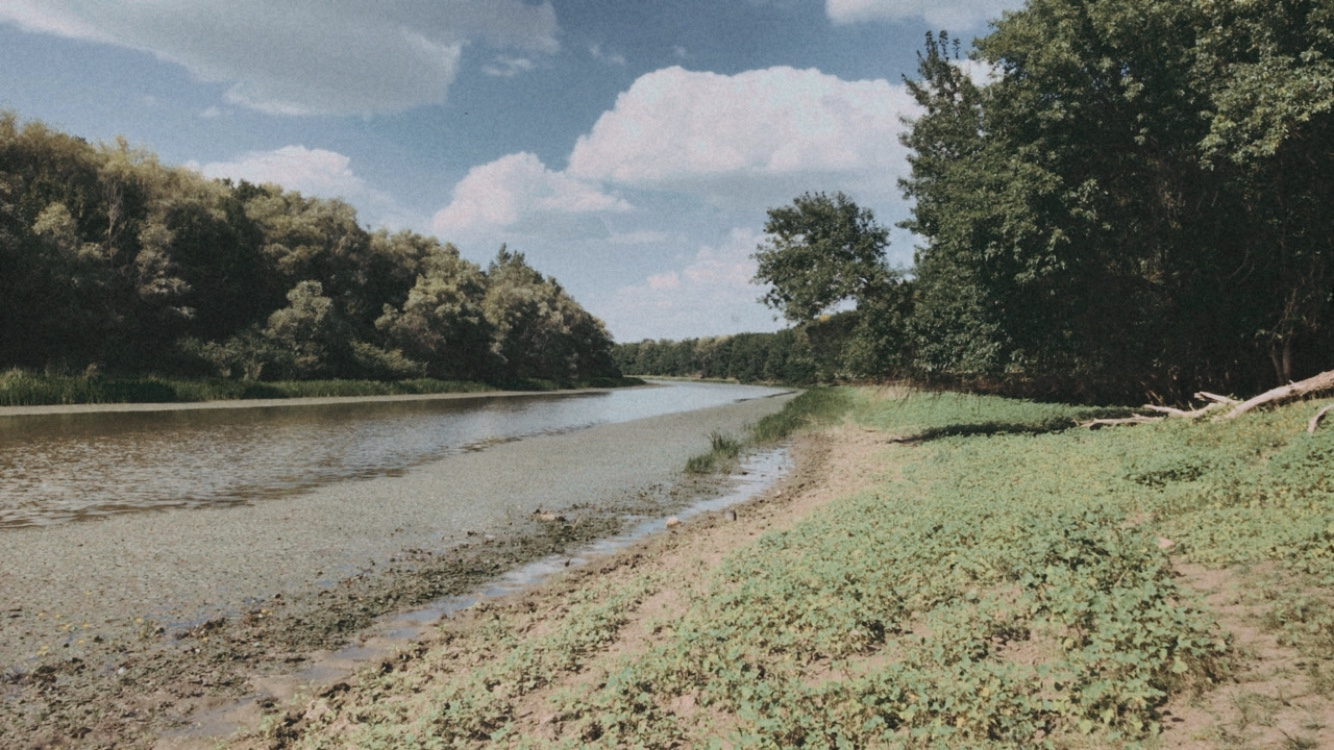
- Pryamaya Kartuba river in Vinny

- Location within Astrakhan Oblast Location within Russia
- Coordinates: 46°28′N 48°16′E
- Country: Russia
- Region: Astrakhan Oblast
- District: Volodarsky District

Government
  - Mayor: Saule Karabalaeva

Population (2017)
  - Total: 756
- Time zone: UTC+4:00 (Astrakhan Time)
- Postal code: 416174

Vinny (Russian: Винный) is a rural locality (a settlement) Volodarsky District, Astrakhan Oblast, Russia and the seat of the eponymous municipality. It is a majority-minority town primarily inhabited by ethnic Kazakhs.

== History ==
First mentions of Vinny date back to around 1918.

== Infrastructure ==
Vinny is served by a public school, library, community center, post office and a few grocery stores. It is located immediately to the east of the highway connecting the city of Astrakhan with the Kazakhstan–Russia border.

== Demographics ==
The population was 753 as of 2010.

=== Ethnic composition ===
Ethnicity	Number	Percentage
Kazakhs	473	62.6%
Russians	224	29.6%
Belarusians	5	0.7%
Tatars	4	0.5%
Kyrgyzs	3	0.4%
Uzbeks	3	0.4%
Not stated	44	5.8%
Total	756	100%

== Geography ==
Vinny is located 29 km (18 mi) northwest of Volodarsky (the district's administrative centre) by road. Vorobyovsky is the nearest rural locality.

== Gallery ==
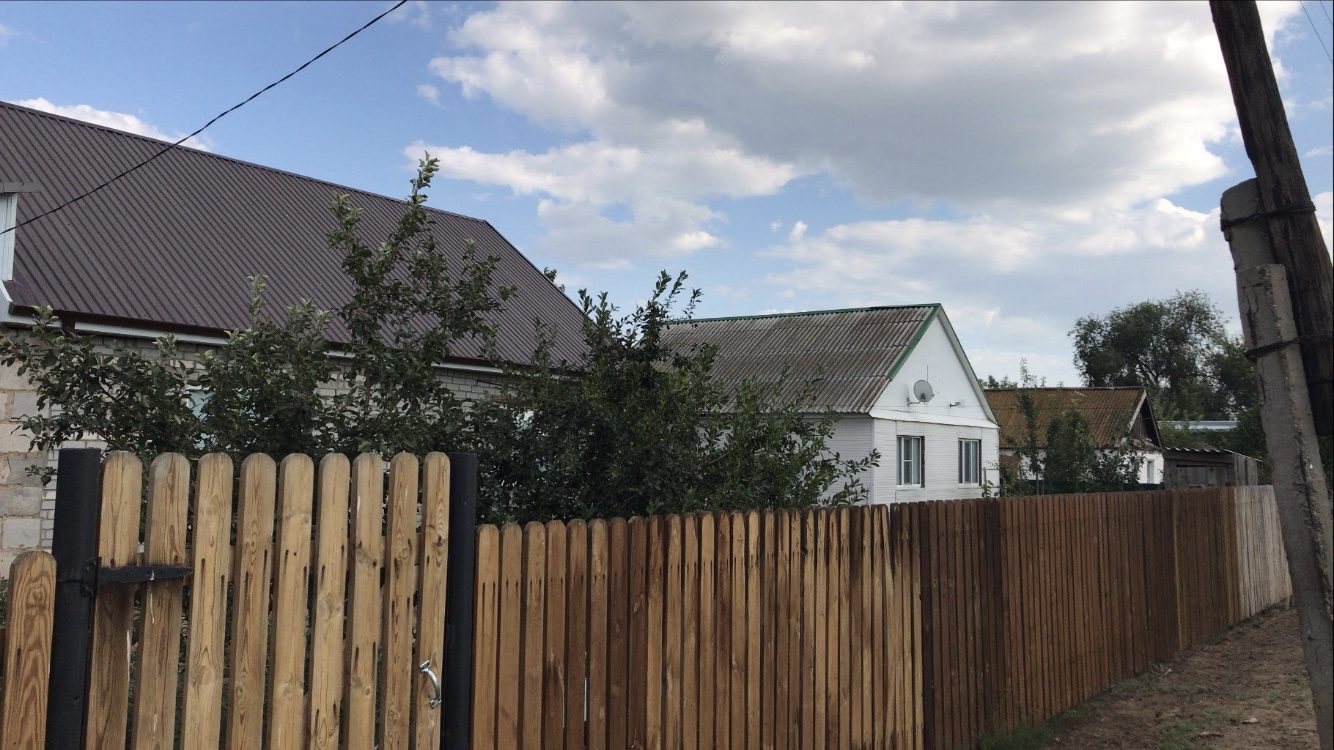
Lesnaya Street in Vinny

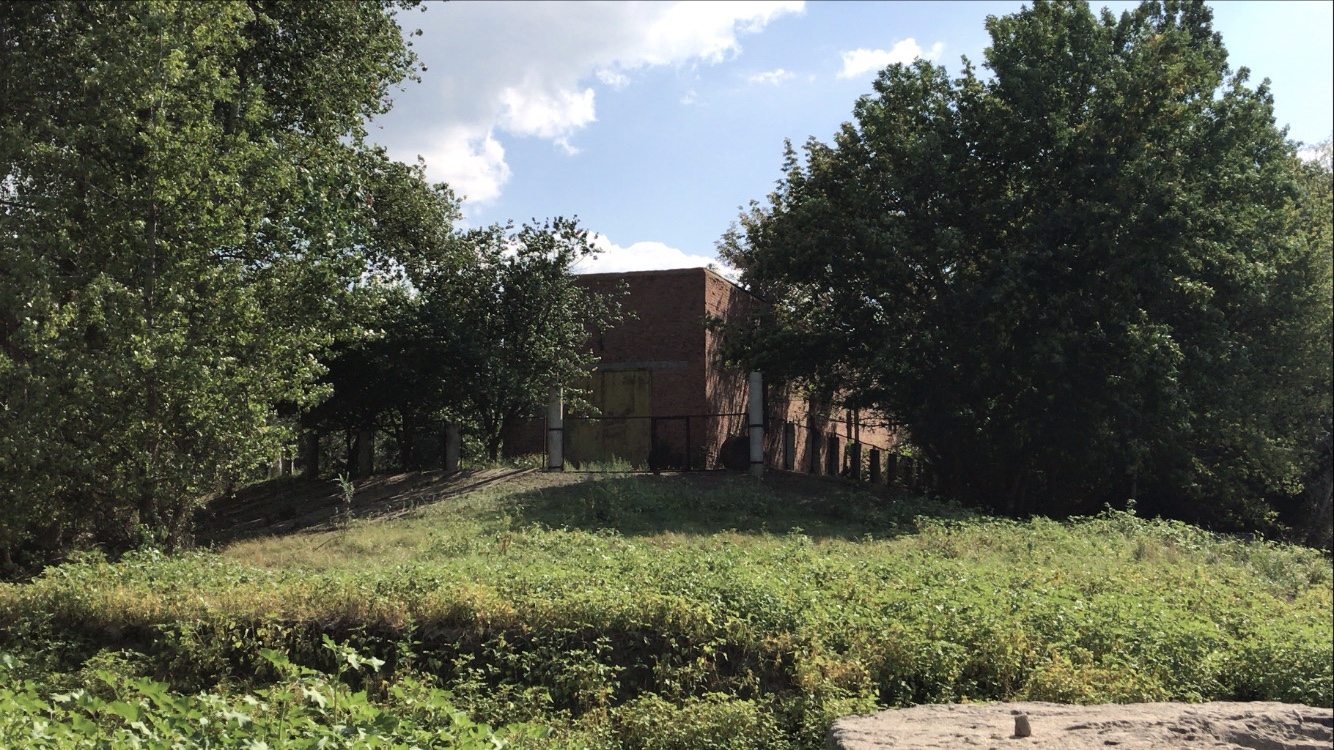
Abandoned power station by the river

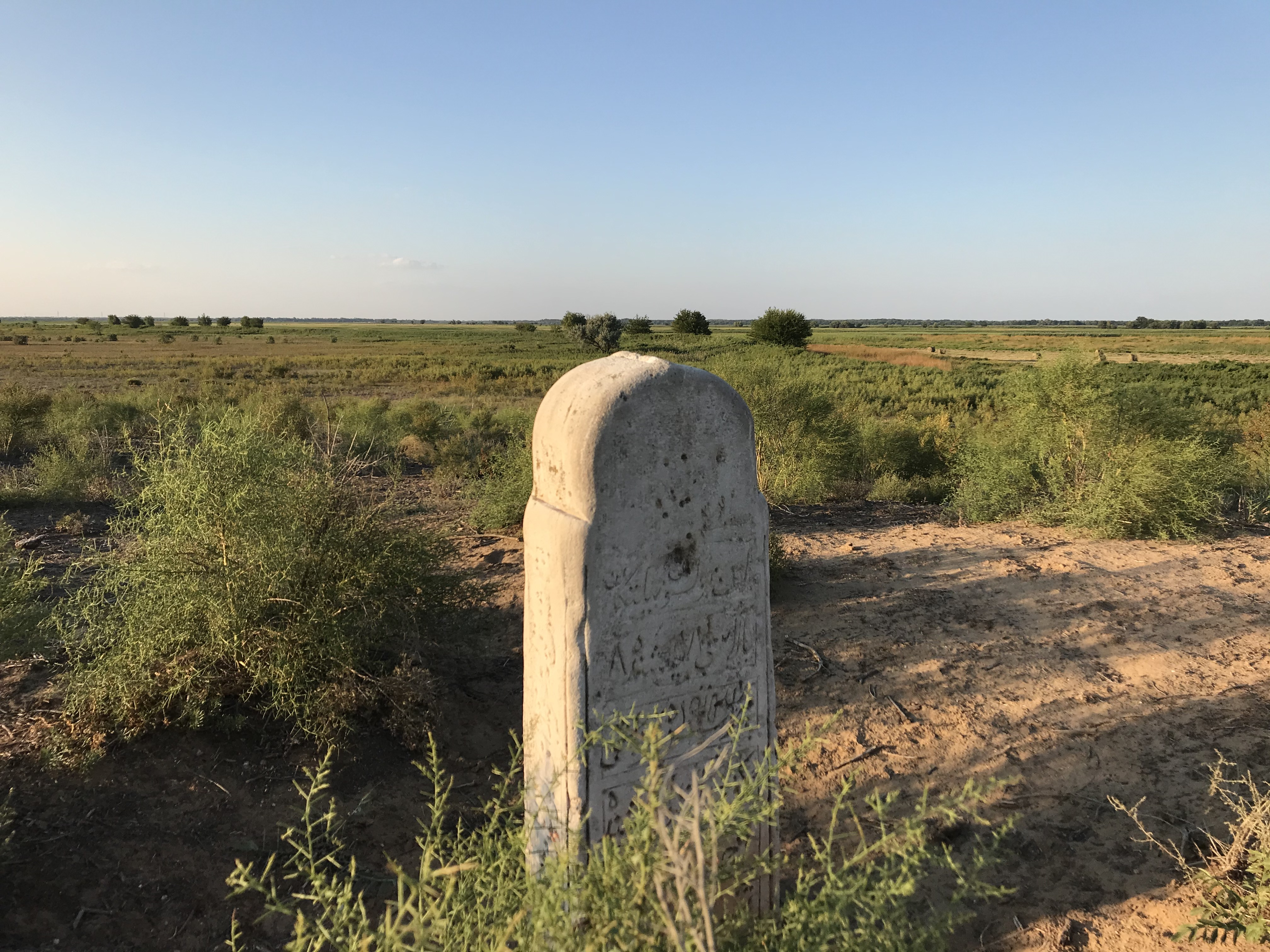
Old cemetery on the Shaytan-Tyube hill

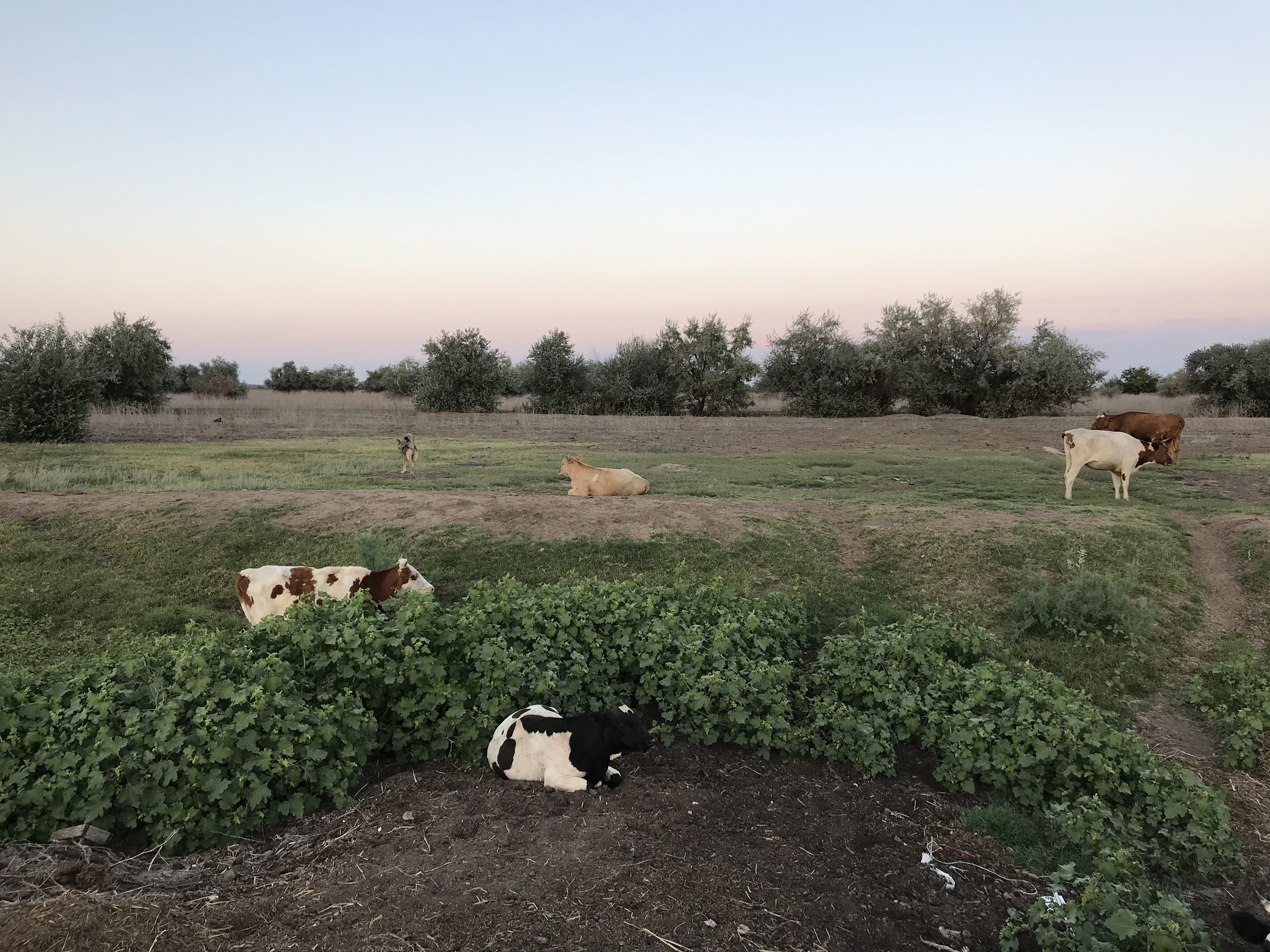
Cows in the former kolkhoz fields
