= Vinny Warren =

Irish-American creative director (born 1966)

- Born: 5 April 1966 (age 59); Galway, Ireland
- Occupation: Advertising creative director
- Known for: Creating Whassup? advertising campaign

Vinny Warren (born 5 April 1966) is an Irish-born American advertising creative director, most notable for his iconic "Whassup?" campaign for Budweiser (Anheuser-Busch). Warren was inducted into the Clio Awards Hall of Fame in 2006. He is based in Chicago, Illinois.

== Early life ==
Warren was born in Galway, Ireland in 1966. Warren attended the National University of Ireland, Galway, and moved to London in 1988, where he studied design and art. In 1990, Warren won a US Diversity Immigrant Visa lottery and moved to New York, where he briefly worked as a horse and buggy driver in Central Park, before being hired by advertising executive Ed McCabe in 1992.

== Career ==
Warren worked as a copywriter at McCabe & Co. Advertising from 1992 to 1994. In 1995, Warren moved to Chicago, where he continued to work as a copywriter before being hired as a creative director by Doyle Dane Bernbach in 1998, where he worked extensively on developing advertisements for Budweiser.

In 1999, Warren developed the "Whassup?" campaign along with art director Chuck Taylor, based on the short film True by Charles Stone III, who also directed the Budweiser variant. The ad was a success, winning an immense number of advertising industry awards, including a Cannes Lions Grand Prix, a Grand Clio, and others. In 2006, the advertisement was inducted into the Clio Awards Hall of Fame.

In 2006, Warren started his own advertising agency, The Escape Pod. Warren served as executive creative director of The Escape Pod until 2021, when Warren left the agency and became a freelance creative director.

== Personal life ==
Warren has a wife and children, and lives in the suburbs of Chicago.
