= Vinnie, Kentucky =

Unincorporated community in Kentucky, United States

Vinnie
- Unincorporated community
- Location within the state of Kentucky Vinnie (the United States)
- Coordinates: 37°00′39″N 84°52′9″W
- Country: United States
- State: Kentucky
- County: Russell
- Elevation: 1,040 ft (320 m)
- Time zone: UTC-6 (Central (CST))
  - Summer (DST): UTC-5 (EDT)
- GNIS feature ID: 509292

Vinnie is an unincorporated community located in Russell County, Kentucky, United States.
