= Iowa's 21st House of Representatives district =

American legislative district

House District 21
- Type: District of the Lower house
- Location: Iowa
- Representative: Brooke Boden
- Parent organization: Iowa General Assembly

The 21st District of the Iowa House of Representatives in the state of Iowa. It is currently composed of part of Warren and Marion Counties.

== Current elected officials ==
Brooke Boden is the representative currently representing the district.

== Past representatives ==
The district has previously been represented by:

- Robert R. Dodds, 1957–1963
- Donald V. Doyle, 1971–1973
- Richard Norpel, 1973–1975
- Thomas J. Gilloon, 1975–1979
- Joseph J. Welsh, 1979–1983
- Robert H. Renken, 1983–1997
- Bill Dix, 1997–2003
- Donald L. Shoultz, 2003–2007
- Tami Wiencek, 2007–2009
- Kerry Burt, 2009–2011
- Anesa Kajtazović, 2011–2013
- Jack Drake, 2013–2015
- Tom Moore, 2015–2023
