= Vincent =

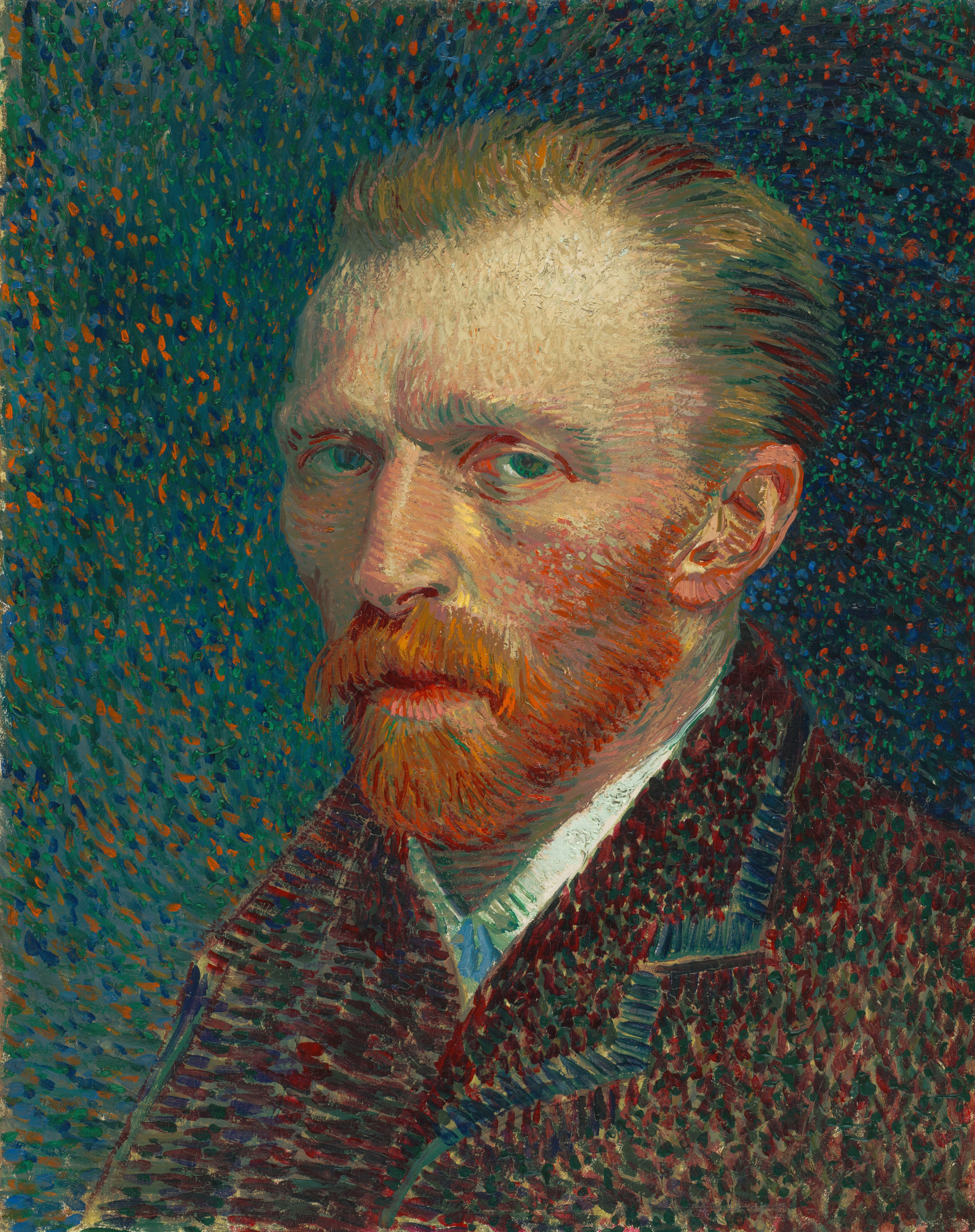
- Self-portrait of Vincent van Gogh in 1887
- Pronunciation: /ˈvɪnsənt/ VINN-sent
- Gender: Male

Origin
- Origin: Latin
- Meaning: "prevailing" "conquering"

Other names
- Nicknames: Vince, Vin, Vinny
- Related names: Vincentius, Vicente, Vincente, Vincenzo, Vincenza, Vincenzi, Vincentia, Vincențiu, Vinko, Vikentije, Vikenty, Vikentiy Vinci, Vance, Vincenc, Vicko

Vincent (Latin: Vincentius) is a masculine given name originating from the Roman name Vincentius, which itself comes from the Latin verb vincere, meaning "to conquer."

== People with the given name ==
=== Artists ===
- Vincent Apap (1909–2003), Maltese sculptor
- Vincent van Gogh (1853–1890), Dutch Post-Impressionist painter
- Vincent Munier (born 1976), French wildlife photographer
- Vincent Namatjira (born 1983), Aboriginal Australian painter

=== Saints ===
- Vincent of Saragossa (died 304), deacon and martyr, patron saint of Lisbon and Valencia
- Vincent, Orontius, and Victor (died 305), martyrs who evangelized in the Pyrenees
- Vincent of Digne (died 379), French bishop of Digne
- Vincent of Lérins (died 445), Church father, Gallic author of early Christian writings
- Vincent Madelgarius (died 677), Benedictine monk who established two monasteries in France
- Vincent Ferrer (1350–1419), Valencian Dominican missionary and logician
- Vincent de Paul (1581–1660), Catholic priest who served the poor
- Vicente Liem de la Paz (Vincent Liem the Nguyen, 1732–1773), Vincent Duong, Vincent Tuong, and Vincent Yen Do of the Vietnamese Martyrs
- Vincent Pallotti (1795–1850), Italian ecclesiastic

=== Politicians and government officials ===
- Vincent Auriol (1884–1966), French politician who served as President of France from 1947 to 1954
- Vincent Bru (born 1955), French politician
- Sir John Vincent "Vince" Cable (born 1943), British politician
- Vincent Candelora, American businessman, lawyer, and politician
- Vince Catania (born 1977), Australian politician
- Vincent Cianci (1941–2016), American politician
- Vincent Collis, American politician
- Vincent B. Dixie (born 1973), American businessman and politician
- Vincent Fang (entrepreneur) (born 1943), politician in Hong Kong
- Vincent Fort (1956–2024), American politician, member of the Georgia State Senate (1996–2017)
- Vincent C. Gray (born 1942), American politician, former Mayor of the District of Columbia (2011–2015)
- Vincent Kumura, Papua New Guinean politician
- Vincent Marchiselli (1928–2013), Democratic politician
- Vince Martin (politician) (1920–2001), Australian politician
- Vincent Massey (1887–1967), Canadian lawyer, diplomat and 18th Governor General of Canada
- Vincent Orange (born 1957), American politician and attorney
- Vincent Perera (1918–1993), Sri Lankan Sinhala politician, Mayor of Colombo from 1965-1966
- Vincent Pierre (born 1964), American politician
- Vincent Rolland (born 1970), French politician
- Vincent Seitlinger (born 1987), French politician
- Vincent Verouden (born 1973), Dutch politician
- Vincent Wheatley, British Virgin Islands politician
- Vincent Stuart de Silva Wikramanayake (1876–1953), Sri Lankan Sinhala lawyer and politician

=== In sports ===
==== American football ====
- Vincent Anthony Jr. (born 2004), American football player
- Vince Biegel (born 1993), American football player
- Vinnie Clark (born 1979), American former National Football League player
- Vince Courville (born 1959), American former National Football League player
- Vincent Dancy (born 1984), American football coach
- Vince Dooley (1932–2022), American former football coach
- Vincent Gray (American football) (born 1999), American National Football League player
- Vincent Edward "Bo" Jackson (born November 30, 1962) American former National Football League player and former Major League Baseball player.
- Vince Lombardi (1913–1970), American National Football League player, coach and executive
- Vince Promuto (1938–2021), American National Football League player
- Vincent Taylor (American football) (born 1994), American football player
- Vinny Testaverde (born 1963), American former National Football League quarterback
- Vince Warren (born 1963), American former National Football League player
- Vince Wilfork (born 1981), American former National Football League player

==== Association football ====
- Vincent Aboubakar (born 1992), Cameroonian professional footballer
- Vincent Bossou (born 1986), Togolese footballer
- Vincent Candela (born 1973), French football player
- Vincent Enyeama (born 1982), Nigerian former footballer
- Vincent Kompany (born 1986), Belgian former footballer
- Vincent Lamy (born 1999), Canadian soccer player
- Vincent Mauro (1943–2024), Italian-American FIFA football referee
- Vincent Nogueira (born 1988), French former professional footballer
- Vincent Rabiega (born 1995), professional footballer
- Vincent Rüfli (born 1988), Swiss professional footballer
- Vincent Sierro (born 1995), Swiss professional footballer

==== Baseball ====
- Vince Coleman (born 1961), American former Major League Baseball player
- Vince DiMaggio (1912–1986), American Major League Baseball player, older brother of Joe and Dom DiMaggio
- Vin Scully (1927–2022), American sportscaster, called Brooklyn/Los Angeles Dodgers games from 1950 to 2016

==== Basketball ====
- Vincent Askew (born 1966), American former professional basketball player
- Vince Carter (born 1977), National Basketball Association player
- Vincent Collet (born 1963), French basketball coach
- Vincent Kesteloot (born 1995), Belgian professional basketball player
- Vincent Masingue (born 1976), French former professional basketball player
- Vincent Mendy (basketball) (born 1983), French professional basketball player
- Vincent Nguyen (basketball) (born 1995), Vietnamese-Dutch professional basketball player
- Vincent Poirier (born 1993), French professional basketball player
- Vincent Rivaldi Kosasih (born 1996), Indonesian basketball player
- Vincent Sanford (born 1990), American basketball player
- Vincent Yarbrough (born 1981), American former professional basketball player

==== Wrestling ====
- Vince McMahon (born 1945), American professional wrestling promoter and owner, chairman and CEO of World Wrestling Entertainment
- Vince McMahon Sr. (1914–1984), American professional wrestling promoter, father of the above
- Vinny Marseglia (born 1986), known as Vincent in ROH
- Virgil (wrestler) (born 1962), known as Vincent in WCW

==== Other sports ====
- Vinnie Anderson (born 1979), New Zealand rugby league footballer
- Vincent Astrolabio (born 1997), Filipino professional boxer
- Vincent Bachet (born 1978), professional French ice hockey defenceman
- Vincent Barnes (born 1960), South African first-class cricketer
- Vincent Barteau (born 1962), former French road racing cyclist
- Vincent Berger (born 1967), French sailor
- Vincent Blatchford (1906–1976), English table tennis player
- Vincent Boury (born 1969), French table tennis player
- Vincent Brewster (born 1940), Barbadian cricketer
- Vincent Carrara (born 1905, date of death unknown), French racing cyclist
- Vincent Casse (born 1994), Belgian acrobatic gymnast
- Vincent Chepkok (born 1988), Kenyan professional long-distance runner who specializes in the 5000 metres
- Vincent Chiu (born 1998), American badminton player
- Vince Clarke (cricketer) (born 1971), English former cricketer
- Vincent Clerc (born 1981), former French rugby union player
- Vincent Confait (born 1959), Seychellois sprinter
- Vincent Defrasne (born 1977), former French biathlete
- Vincent De Haître (born 1994), Canadian dual-sport athlete competing as both a speed skater and track cyclist
- Vincent de Nardi (born 1967), French water polo player
- Vincent Dias Dos Santos (born 1990), Luxembourgish cyclo-cross cyclist
- Vincent Feigenbutz (born 1995), German professional boxer
- Vincent Hermance (born 1984), French mountain bike trials cyclist
- Vincent C Y Ho (born 1990), horse racing jockey
- Vincent Gagnon (born 1981), Canadian retired racquetball player
- Vincent Garos (born 1982), retired French sailor
- Vincent Gauthier-Manuel (born 1986), French alpine skier and Paralympic athlete
- Vincent Gérard (born 1986), French former professional handball player
- Vincent Hancock (born 1989), American Olympic shooter
- Vinnie Hinostroza (born 1994), American hockey player
- Vincent Hoppezak (born 1999), Dutch road and track cyclist
- Vincent Jay (born 1985), former French biathlete and non-commissioned officer
- Vincent Keymer (born 2004), German chess player
- Vincent Mumo Kiilu (born 1982), Kenyan sprint runner and hurdler
- Vincent Kipchumba (born 1990), Kenyan long-distance runner
- Vincent Kipruto (born 1987), Kenyan long-distance runner
- Vincent Koch (born 1990), South African professional rugby union player
- Vincent Kriechmayr (born 1991), Austrian World Cup alpine ski racer
- Vincent Laigle (born 1973), French badminton player
- Vincent Lange (born 1974), German volleyball player
- Vincent Lau (born 1996), Hong Kong road cyclist
- Vincent Lavenu (born 1956), French former professional road bicycle racer
- Vincent Lecavalier (born 1980), Canadian former National Hockey League player
- Vincent Lecrubier (born 1986), French sprint canoer
- Vincent Le Dauphin (born 1976), retired French athlete who specialised in the 3000 metres steeplechase
- Vincent Le Quellec (born 1975), French former track cyclist
- Vincent Libert, Belgian sports shooter
- Vincent Limare (born 1992), French judoka
- Vincent Luis (born 1989), French professional triathlete
- Vincent Lynch (cyclist) (born 1968), Barbadian former cyclist
- Vincent Matheron (born 1998), French skateboarder
- Vincent Matthews (athlete) (born 1947), American former sprinter
- Vincent Millot (born 1986), French tennis player
- Vincent Milou (born 1996), regular-footed French professional skateboarder
- Vincent Pelluard (born 1990), French-Colombian cyclist
- Vincent Pelo (born 1988), French rugby union player
- Vince Phillips (born 1963), American boxer and former IBF champion
- Vincent Morris Scheer (1904–1986), light welterweight champion boxer under the ring name Mushy Callahan
- Vincent Spadea (born 1974), tennis player from the United States
- Vince O'Sullivan (born 1957), American racewalker
- Vincent Reffet (1984–2020), French BASE jumper, skydiver, wingsuit flyer, and jetman
- Vincent Ricard (born 1985), French bobsledder
- Vincent Richards (1903 – 1959), American tennis player
- Vincent Riendeau (diver) (born 1996), Canadian elite diver
- Vincent Roberge (born 1997), Canadian curler
- Vincent Rousseau (born 1962), former long-distance runner from Belgium
- Vincent Salazard (1909–1993), French racing cyclist
- Vincent Soler (1928–2012), Algerian racing cyclist
- Vincent ter Schure (born 1979), Dutch Paralympic cyclist
- Vincent Trocheck (born 1993), American professional ice hockey center
- Vincent Vitetta (1925–2021), French cyclist
- Vincent Vittoz (born 1975), French former cross-country skier, non-commissioned officer and coach
- Vincent Voorn (born 1984), Dutch show jumper
- Vincent Winn (born 1966), former English cricketer
- Vincent Wong (born 1990), badminton player of Chinese-Indonesian descent
- Vincent Zhou (born 2000), American figure skater
- Vincent Zouaoui-Dandrieux (born 1980), French long-distance runner who specialises in the steeplechase

=== Actors and directors ===
- Vincent Cassel (born 1966), French actor
- Vincent Corazza, Canadian voice actor
- Vincent Caso, American Actor
- Vincent De Paul (actor), American Actor
- Vincent D'Onofrio (born 1959), American actor, director, producer, writer, and singer
- Vincent Gallo (born 1961), American actor, director and musician
- George Vincent "Vince" Gilligan, (born 1967), American writer, director, and producer
- Vincent Guastaferro (born 1950), American film, stage and television actor
- Vince Howard (1929–2002), American film and television actor
- Vinnie Jones (born 1965), British actor and former footballer
- Vincent Kartheiser (born 1979), American actor
- Vincent Klyn (born 1960), New Zealand-born American professional surfer and actor
- Vincent Kok (born 1965), Hong Kong actor and film director
- Vincent Laresca (born 1974), American Actor
- Vincent LaRusso (born 1978), American Actor
- Vincent Macaigne French Actor
- Vincent Martella (born 1992), American actor, singer, and musician
- Vincente Minnelli (1903–1986), American director, best known for directing classic movie musicals
- Vincent Pastore (1946–2026), American actor
- Vincent Piazza (born 1976), American actor, singer, and producer
- Vincent Price (1911–1993), American actor best known for his performances in horror films
- Vincent Perez (born 1964), American Actor
- Vincent Rodriguez III (born 1982), American Actor
- Vincent Regan (born 1966), British actor
- Vincent Rottiers (born 1986), French Actor
- Vincent Riotta (born 1959), British actor
- Vincent Schiavelli (1948-2005), American actor his tall stature
- Vincent Sherman (1906–2006), American director and actor
- Vincent Tong (voice actor) (born 1980), Canadian actor
- Vincent Ventresca (born 1966), American Actor
- Vincent Vaas (1922–2004), Sri Lankan Sinhala actor
- Vincent Van Patten, American Actor
- Vince Vaughn (born 1970), American actor
- Vincent Wong (born 1983), Hong Kong actor and singer
- Vincent Young (actor) (Born 1965), American actor
- Vincent Zhao (born 1972), Chinese actor and martial artist

=== In music ===
==== Songs ====
- "Vincent" (Don McLean song), 1972 folk rock song with the opening line "Starry Starry Night"
- "Vincent" (Sarah Connor song), 2019 pop song
- "Vincent", a song by Car Seat Headrest from their 2016 album Teens of Denial

==== Music artists ====
as Vincent

- Vincent (music producer) (born 1995), Canadian electronic music producer and pianist (born Robert Hughes)
- Vincent Lübeck (1654–1740), German Baroque-era composer of organ music
- Vincent Persichetti (1915–1987), American composer, teacher and pianist
- Vincent Pontare (born 1980), Swedish singer and songwriter, known also by the mononym Vincent
- St. Vincent (musician), stage name of American indie rock singer-songwriter and guitarist Annie Clark (born 1982)
- Vinnie Amico (born 1969), American multi-genre drummer, long-standing member of jam band Moe
- Vinnie Bell (1932–2019), American session guitarist
- Vinnie Colaiuta (born 1956), an American session drummer
- Vincent Mason (rapper) (born 1970), American rapper and member of the group De La Soul
- Vincent Mason (singer) (born 2000), American country music singer
- Vinnie Moore (born 1964), American guitarist and member of the English hard rock band UFO
- Vinnie Paul (1964–2018), American rock/metal drummer, founding member of the band Pantera
- Vincent Peirani (born 1980), French jazz accordionist, vocalist and composer
- Vinnie Vincent (born 1952), American rock/metal guitarist, formerly with Kiss

As Vince

- Vince Clarke (born 1960), English musician, part of Depeche Mode, Yazoo, The Assembly, Erasure, VCMG
- Vince Gill (born 1957), American country music singer, songwriter and musician
- Vince Guaraldi (1928–1976), American jazz musician and pianist
- Vince Hill (1934–2023), English singer
- Vince Martin (singer) (1937–2018), American folk singer and songwriter
- Vince Neil (born 1961), American lead singer of rock band Mötley Crüe
- Vince Staples (Born 1993), American rapper

=== Writers ===
- Vincent Harding (July 25, 1931 – May 19, 2014), American historian and civil rights activist
- Vincent O'Sullivan (American writer) (1868–1940), American short story writer, poet and critic
- Vincent O'Sullivan (New Zealand poet) (1937–2024), New Zealand poet, short story writer, novelist, playwright, critic and editor
- Vincent Cronin (1924–2011), British biographer
- Vince Powell (1928–2009), British sitcom writer
- Vincent Waller, American writer and storyboard artist who worked on SpongeBob SquarePants

=== Other ===
- Vincent, Prince of Denmark (born 2011)
- Vincent Henry Ludovici Anthonisz, Sri Lankan Burgher physician and military officer
- Vincent Astor (1891–1959), American businessman and philanthropist
- Vincent Boissonneau (ca. 1635-1715), French soldier and farmer
- Vincent Bolloré (born 1952), French billionaire businessman
- Vincent Cobée (born 1968/1969), French businessman, CEO of Citroën
- Vincent Connare (born 1960), American type designer and former Microsoft employee
- Vincent Crawford (born 1950), American economist
- Vincent du Vigneaud (1901–1978), American biochemist
- Vincent DeDomenico (1915–2007), American entrepreneur
- Bernard Vincent Finnigan, Australian politician
- Vincent F. Hendricks (born 1970), Danish philosopher and logician
- Vincent Ganty (1881–1957), French political activist
- Vincent Kane (born 1935), Welsh broadcaster and writer
- Vincent Kling (architect) (1916–2013), American architect
- Vincent Krassousky (1902–1948), Ukrainian cartoonist
- Vincent Lo (born 1948), chairman of Hong Kong–based building-materials and construction firm
- Vincent DePaul Lynch (1927-1984), pharmacology and toxicology professor
- Vincent Mai, American businessman and philanthropist
- Vincent Marotta (1924–2015), American businessman, investor and philanthropist
- Vincent Alan McClelland (1933–2025), British Catholic historian
- Vincent Pons (born 1983), French economist
- Vincent Cartledge Reddish (1926–2015), British astronomer
- Vincent Sardi Jr. (1915–2007), American restaurateur
- Vincent Sardi Sr. (1885–1969), American restaurateur
- Vincent Scully (1920–2017), American art historian
- Vincent Tan (born 1952), Malaysian Chinese businessman and investor
- Vincent Tchenguiz (born 1956), Iranian-British entrepreneur
- Vincent Viola (born 1956), American billionaire businessman and U.S. Army veteran
- Vincent Wardell (1903–1990), Australian businessman, manufacturer and company director
- Vincent Zarrilli (1932–2018), American businessman
- Vincent name meaning (1932–2018), American Name

== Fictional characters ==
- Vincent, a localized name for Hiei, in the Tagalog dub of YuYu Hakusho (known in the Philippines as Ghost Fighter)
- Vincent, a contract killer in the 2004 film Collateral, played by Tom Cruise
- Vincent, the main villain of Over the Hedge
- V.I.N.CENT (Vital Information Necessary CENTralized), a robot in the 1979 Disney film The Black Hole
- Vincent, "The Beast" from Beauty and the Beast (1987 TV series), played by Ron Perlman
- Vincent, a main character in the 2015 film Disorder, played by Matthias Schoenaerts
- Vincent, Walt's dog in Lost
- Father Vincent, in Silent Hill 3
- Vincent Benedict, in the 1988 film Twins, played by Danny DeVito
- Cardinal Vincent Benitez, elected Pope in the film Conclave
- Vincent Brooks, the main character of the 2011 Atlus video game Catherine
- Vincent Chase (born 1976), fictional American actor and director from the HBO series, Entourage.
- Vinz Clortho, Keymaster of Gozer, in the film Ghostbusters
- Vincent Corleone, in The Godfather Part III
- Vincent Crabbe, in the Harry Potter series
- Vincent Dorin, a character from Castlevania: Portrait of Ruin
- Vincent Freeman, the protagonist of the 1997 film Gattaca
- Vincent Gallagher, a private investigator in the TV series Vincent
- Lt. Vincent Hanna, a Robert Homicide Detective killer in the 1995 film Heat, played by Al Pacino
- Vincent Keller, "The Beast" from Beauty and the Beast (2012 TV series), played by Jay Ryan
- Vincent Law, a main character in the series Ergo Proxy
- Vincent MacKenna, in St. Vincent, played by Bill Murray
- Vincent Malloy, central character of the 1982 short stop-motion movie Vincent by Tim Burton
- Vincent Nigel-Murray, one of Dr. Brennan’s "squinterns" from Bones
- Vincent Nightray, from the anime/manga Pandora Hearts
- Vince Noir, one of the main characters of the British comedy show The Mighty Boosh
- Vinnie Patterson, from the Australian soap opera Home and Away, played by Ryan Kwanten
- Vinnie Pappalardo, a villain from the video game Lego City Undercover, voiced by John Guerrasio
- Vincent Phantomhive, in the anime Black Butler
- Vincent Quaranta, the Camorra crime boss and the main antagonist from The Equalizer 3
- Vincent Sinclair, a character from House of Wax
- Vincent Valentine, from Final Fantasy VII
- Vincent Van Ghoul, a Scooby-Doo character
- Vincent Vega, a main character in the film Pulp Fiction
- Vincent Vollachia, in Re:Zero
- Vincent “Vox” Whittman, a main villain from Hazbin Hotel

== See also ==
- Vincent (surname)
- Vincint (born 1991), American musician
- Veni, vidi, vici (literally "I came; I saw; I conquered")
- Victor (name) (literally "winner" or "conqueror")
- Nike (mythology)/Victoria (mythology)
