= McClelland =

McClelland is a surname. Notable people with the surname include:

- Alyssa McClelland, Australian actress
- Charles A. McClelland (1917–2006), American political systems analyst
- Charles P. McClelland (1854–1944), New York politician, and US federal judge
- David McClelland, American psychologist
- Doug McClelland, Australian politician
- George William McClelland, American educator
- Glenn McClelland, American keyboardist
- Helen Grace McClelland (1887–1984), United States Army nurse
- Hugh McClelland (politician) (1875–1958), Australian politician
- James McClelland (disambiguation), several people
- Jim McClelland, Australian senator and judge
- John McClelland (disambiguation), several people
- Mac McClelland, journalist
- Mark McClelland, bassist for Little Doses, previously for Snow Patrol
- Mary Greenway McClelland (1853–1895), American novelist
- Matthew McClelland, (1832-1883), Medal of Honor recipient
- Nina McClelland (1929–2020), American chemist
- Vincent Alan McClelland (1933–2025), British Catholic historian
- Robert McClelland (disambiguation), several people
- Thomas McClelland, U.S. Naval Captain
- Tim McClelland, Major League Baseball umpire

== See also ==
- Clelland, a related surname
- McLelland
- McClelland's Single Malt Scotch whisky
- McClelland, Iowa, a small city in the United States
- McClellan (disambiguation)
