= Kajtazović =

Kajtazović or Kajtazovič is a surname of South Slavic origin. Notable people with the surname include:

- Anesa Kajtazović (born 1986), Bosnian-American politician
- Jasmina Kajtazovič (born 1991), Slovenian-born Bosnian tennis player
