= Robert McClellan =

Robert McClellan may refer to:

- Robert McClellan (state treasurer) (1747–1817), New York state treasurer, 1798–1803
- Robert McClellan (congressman) (1806–1860), U.S. representative from New York
- Robert H. McClellan (1823–1902), American politician in Illinois
- Robert L. McClellan (1822–1889), American politician from Pennsylvania
- Robbie McClellan (born 1981), American college baseball coach and former pitcher

== See also ==
- Robert McClelland (disambiguation)
