= Iowa's 57th House of Representatives district =

American legislative district

House District 57
- Type: District of the Lower house
- Location: Iowa
- Representative: Pat Grassley
- Parent organization: Iowa General Assembly

The 57th District of the Iowa House of Representatives is located in northeastern Iowa, comprising Butler County and parts of Bremer County.

== Current elected officials ==
Pat Grassley is the current representative of the district. He has served as Speaker of the Iowa House of Representatives since January 2020.

== Past representatives ==
The district has previously been represented by:

- Earl M. Willits, 1971–1973
- Andrew P. Varley, 1973–1979
- Virginia Poffenberger, 1979–1983
- Janis Torrence, 1983–1985
- Daniel F. Petersen, 1985–1993
- Paul Bell, 1993–2003
- Jack Drake, 2003–2013
- Nancy Dunkel, 2013–2017
- Shannon Lundgren, 2017–2023
- Pat Grassley, 2023–Present
