= Vicko =

Vicko is a South Slavic masculine given name.

It is a hypocorism of Vincent (Latin: Vincentius), and its use originates from the names of saints.

Notable people with the name include:

- Vicko Adamović (1838–1919), pedagogue and historian from Dubrovnik
- Vicko Andrić (1793–1866), Croatian architect
- Vicko Bujović (1660–1709), Venetian military commander and captain of Perast
- Vicko von Geldersen (died 1391), cloth merchant, councilor and treasurer in Hamburg
- Vicko Krstulović (1905–1988), Croatian Yugoslav communist revolutionary
- Vicko Milatović, Serbian musician and drummer (real name Miroslav)
- Vicko Ruić (born 1959), Croatian film director, screenwriter, producer and actor
- Vicko Ševelj (born 2000), Croatian professional footballer
- Vicko Zmajević (1670–1745), Roman Catholic prelate

== See also ==
- Vice (disambiguation)#People with the name
