= Iowa's 61st House of Representatives district =

American legislative district

House District 61
- Type: District of the Lower house
- Location: Iowa
- Representative: Timi Brown-Powers
- Parent organization: Iowa General Assembly

The 61st District of the Iowa House of Representatives in the state of Iowa. It is currently composed of part of Black Hawk County.

== Current elected officials ==
Timi Brown-Powers is the representative currently representing the district.

== Past representatives ==
The district has previously been represented by:

- Don Alt, 1971–1973
- Richard L. Byerly, 1973–1983
- Clay R. Spear, 1983–1993
- Johnie Hammond, 1993–1995
- Cecelia Burnett, 1995–1999
- Jane Greimann, 1999–2003
- Jo Oldson, 2003–2013
- Anesa Kajtazović, 2013–2015
- Timi Brown-Powers, 2015–2027
- Vincent Collis, 2027
