= Daniel Petersen =

Daniel Petersen may refer to:

- Daniel F. Petersen (born 1951), American politician from Iowa
- Daniel Frederik Petersen (1757–1816), Norwegian military officer
- Danny J. Petersen (1949–1970), posthumous recipient of the Army Medal of Honor in the Vietnam War
- Dan Petersen (born 1972), Danish footballer

== See also ==
- Daniel Peterson (disambiguation)
