= Vinco =

Vinco may refer to:

- Vinco, Pennsylvania, a community in Jackson Township, Cambria County, Pennsylvania, USA
- Vinco Corporation, a Detroit, Michigan-based manufacturer
- Ivo Vinco (1927–2014), Italian opera singer

== See also ==
- Vinko (disambiguation)
