= McLelland =

McLelland is a surname. Notable people with the surname include:

- Callum McLelland (born 1999), Scottish rugby league player
- Charles McLelland (1930–2004), British journalist, controller of BBC Radio 1 and 2
- Chic McLelland (1953–2020), Scottish football player and manager
- Dave McLelland (born 1952), Canadian professional ice hockey goaltender
- David McLelland (1881–1968), Australian politician
- Douglas McLelland (1905–?), Scottish footballer
- Ivan McLelland (born 1931), Canadian ice hockey player
- Jan McLelland (1957–2017), English consultant dermatologist, clinical director, researcher and medical author
- Jim McClelland (1915–1999), Australian lawyer, politician and judge
- Melissa McClelland (born 1979), American-Canadian singer-songwriter
- Randal McLelland (born 1985), American skeet shooter in the 2008 Olympic games
- Ronald McLelland (1926–2014), Canadian politician
- Stanley Louis McLelland (1945–2020), American businessman and diplomat
- Steve McLelland (born 1957), Scottish professional footballer
