= Pat Grassley =

American politician (born 1983)

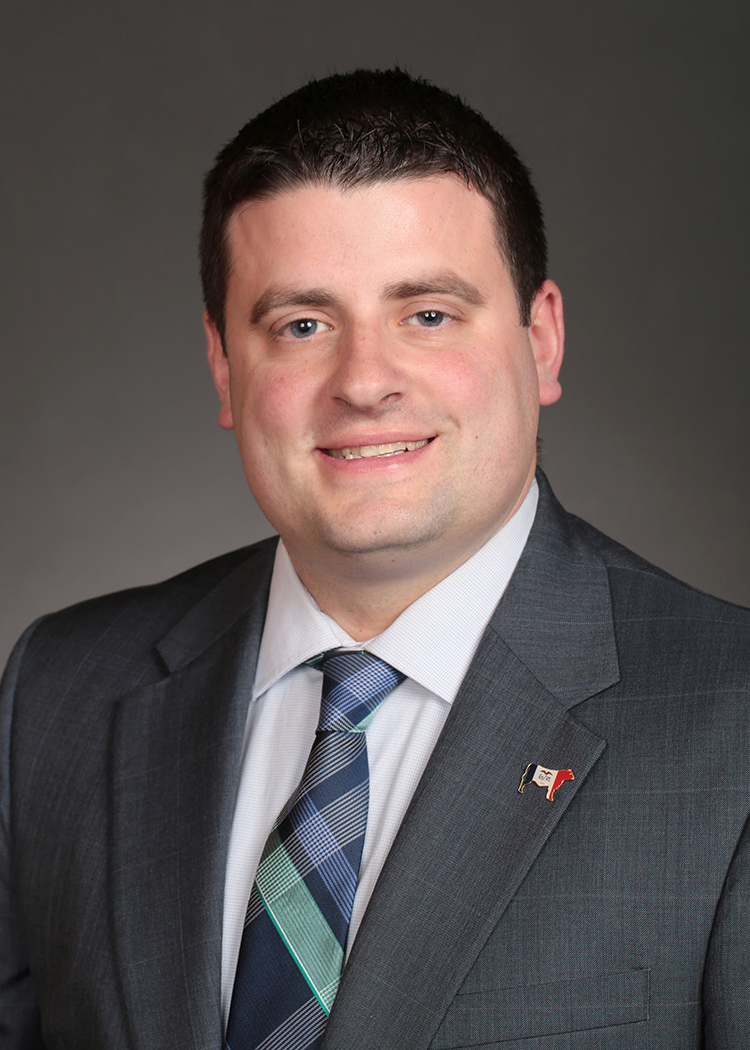
- Official portrait, 2019

Speaker of the Iowa House of Representatives
- Incumbent
- Assumed office January 13, 2020
- Preceded by: Linda Upmeyer

Member of the Iowa House of Representatives
- Incumbent
- Assumed office January 8, 2007
- Preceded by: Bill Dix
- Constituency: 17th district (2007–2013); 50th district (2013–2023); 57th district (2023–present)

Personal details
- Born: Patrick Lynn Grassley; May 26, 1983 (age 43) Cedar Falls, Iowa, U.S.
- Party: Republican
- Spouse: Amanda Boheman (m. 2005; div. 2022)
- Children: 3
- Relatives: Chuck Grassley (grandfather)
- Education: Hawkeye Community College (AA)
- Website: State House website

Patrick Lynn Grassley (born May 26, 1983) is an American politician. A member of the Republican Party, he is the grandson of Iowa United States Senator Chuck Grassley. He has served as the Iowa State Representative for its 57th District since 2023, having previously served the state's 17th (2007–2013) and 50th (2013–2023) districts in the Iowa House of Representatives. He was elected Speaker of the state's House in 2020.

== Early life and education ==
Grassley was born in Cedar Falls, Iowa. He was raised in New Hartford, Iowa. His father Robin is a farmer, and his mother Diane is a T.A. in the Dike-New Hartford School District in Dike, Iowa. Grassley has two younger sisters, and is the grandson of U.S. Senator Chuck Grassley.

He graduated from Dike-New Hartford High School in 2002 and received an associate of arts degree in agribusiness from Hawkeye Community College in 2004. He has taken courses toward a bachelor's degree at the University of Northern Iowa, where he unsuccessfully ran for student body president.

== Iowa House of Representatives ==
=== Elections ===
In 2006, Grassley ran for a seat in the Iowa House of Representatives. He defeated Alek Wipperman, 57% to 43%. In 2008, Grassley won re-election to a second term, defeating Democrat Cayla Baresel, 66% to 34%. In 2010, he won re-election to a third term unopposed.

In 2012, after redistricting, he decided to run in the newly redrawn 50th district, which included a southern portion of Butler County, a northern portion of Hardin County, and all of Grundy County. Fellow Republican State Representative Annette Sweeney also decided to run in the district. Grassley defeated Sweeney 61% to 39%, and won a fourth term in the general election unopposed.

In 2022, after redistricting, he decided to run in the newly redrawn 57th district.

Grassley won with large margins in the 2014, 2016, 2018, 2020, 2022, and 2024 elections. In all of his elections, he received at least 55% of the vote.

=== Tenure ===
In January 2020, Grassley was elected as Speaker of the Iowa House of Representatives. He had previously chaired the budget-writing committee.

== Personal life ==
Grassley and his wife Amanda married in 2005. According to court records, they were divorced in 2022. The Grassleys have two daughters and a son.

Grassley works on his family's farm with his father and grandfather, and is a member of the Farm Bureau.

In 2014, there was speculation that Grassley was being groomed to succeed his grandfather, U.S. Senator Chuck Grassley, upon his retirement. In 2013 however, Chuck Grassley said, "[Pat] and I have never had that discussion and he's never told me that he wanted to run for the United States Senate." Despite this, Pat Grassley said in a January 2025 interview that he wouldn't rule out running for his grandfather's seat in the future.

== Electoral history ==
2006 Iowa 17th District House Primary Election Results
Party	Candidate	Votes	%	±%
Republican	Pat Grassley	2,499	99.72%	
	Scattering	7	0.28%	
Turnout		2,506	100%	

2006 Iowa 17th District House General Election Results
Party	Candidate	Votes	%	±%
Republican	Pat Grassley	6,553	55.54%	
Democratic	Alex Wipperman	5,039	42.71%	
	Overvotes, Undervotes and Scattering	206	1.75%	
Turnout		11,798	100%	

2008 Iowa 17th District House Primary Election Results
Party	Candidate	Votes	%	±%
Republican	Pat Grassley	1,532	91.90%	
	Under Vote and Scattering	135	8.10%	
Turnout		1,667	100%	

2008 Iowa 17th District House General Election Results
Party	Candidate	Votes	%	±%
Republican	Pat Grassley	9,836	64.34%	
Democratic	Cayla Baresel	5,102	33.37%	
	Overvotes, Undervotes and Scattering	348	2.29%	
Turnout		15,286	100%	

2010 Iowa 17th District House Primary Election Results
Party	Candidate	Votes	%	±%
Republican	Pat Grassley	2,890	87.89%	
	Under Vote and Scattering	398	12.11%	
Turnout		3,288	100%	

2010 Iowa 17th District House General Election Results
Party	Candidate	Votes	%	±%
Republican	Pat Grassley	9,066	75.97%	
	Write ins	196	1.65%	
	Undervotes	2,671	22.38%	
Turnout		11,933	100%	

2012 Iowa 50th District House Primary Election Results
Party	Candidate	Votes	%	±%
Republican	Patrick Grassley	2,506	60.86%	
Republican	Annette Sweeney	1,588	38.59%	
	Write in, Under Vote and Over Votes	23	0.55%	
Turnout		4,117	100%	

2012 Iowa 50th District House General Election Results
Party	Candidate	Votes	%	±%
Republican	Patrick Grassley	12,187	75.03%	
	Write ins	290	1.79%	
	Undervotes and Overvotes	3,765	23.18%	
Turnout		16,242	100%	

2014 Iowa 50th District House Primary Election Results
Party	Candidate	Votes	%	±%
Republican	Pat Grassley	2,161	85.14%	
	Write ins	25	1.00%	
	Undervotes and Overvotes	352	13.86%	
Turnout		2,538	100%	

2014 Iowa 50th District House General Election Results
Party	Candidate	Votes	%	±%
Republican	Pat Grassley	8,931	71.80%	
Democratic	Doris Fritz	3,164	25.41%	
	Write ins	24	0.19%	
	Undervotes and Overvotes	332	2.6%	
Turnout		12,451	100%	

2016 Iowa 50th District House Primary Election Results
Party	Candidate	Votes	%	±%
Republican	Pat Grassley	904	88.88%	
	Write ins	13	1.27%	
	Undervotes and Overvotes	100	9.85%	
Turnout		1,017	100%	

2016 Iowa 50th District House General Election Results
Party	Candidate	Votes	%	±%
Republican	Pat Grassley	11,493	72.22%	
Democratic	Doris Fritz	3,901	24.51%	
	Write ins	18	0.12%	
	Undervotes and Overvotes	501	3.15%	
Turnout		15,913	100%	

2018 Iowa 50th District House Primary Election Results
Party	Candidate	Votes	%	±%
Republican	Pat Grassley	1,789	86.97%	
	Write ins	10	0.49%	
	Undervotes and Overvotes	258	12.54%	
Turnout		2,057	100%	

2018 Iowa 50th District House General Election Results
Party	Candidate	Votes	%	±%
Republican	Pat Grassley	8,763	65.83%	
Democratic	Dennis J. Evans	4,346	32.65%	
	Write ins	5	0.03%	
	Undervotes and Overvotes	197	1.49%	
Turnout		13,311	100%	

2020 Iowa 50th District House Primary Election Results
Party	Candidate	Votes	%	±%
Republican	Pat Grassley	2,970	94.50%	
	Write ins	13	0.41%	
	Undervotes and Overvotes	160	5.09%	
Turnout		3,143	100%	

2020 Iowa 50th District House General Election Results
Party	Candidate	Votes	%	±%
Republican	Pat Grassley	11,683	69.18%	
Democratic	Dennis J. Evans	4,733	28.01%	
	Write ins	20	0.11%	
	Undervotes and Overvotes	456	2.70%	
Turnout		16,892	100%	

2022 Iowa 57th District House Primary Election Results
Party	Candidate	Votes	%	±%
Republican	Pat Grassley	2,241	89.92%	
	Write ins	27	1.10%	
	Undervotes and Overvotes	224	8.98%	
Turnout		2,492	100%	

2022 Iowa 50th District House General Election Results
Party	Candidate	Votes	%	±%
Republican	Pat Grassley	8,895	63.57%	
Democratic	Carissa Froyum	4,895	34.98%	
	Write ins	14	0.10%	
	Undervotes and Overvotes	188	1.34%	
Turnout		13,992	100%	

2024 Iowa 50th District House Primary Election Results
Party	Candidate	Votes	%	±%
Republican	Pat Grassley	604	90.70%	
	Write ins	15	2.25%	
	Undervotes and Overvotes	47	7.05%	
Turnout		666	100%	

2024 Iowa 57th District House General Election Results
Party	Candidate	Votes	%	±%
Republican	Pat Grassley	10,869	58.78%	
Democratic	Shawn Ellerbroek	7,180	38.82%	
	Write ins	18	0.09%	
	Undervotes and Overvotes	425	2.30%	
Turnout		18,492	100%	

Political offices
Preceded by Linda Upmeyer	Speaker of the Iowa House of Representatives; 2020–present	Incumbent
