= Vincenzi =

- Gender: Male

Origin
- Origin: Latin nomen Vincent
- Region of origin: Italy

Vincenzi is a surname. Notable people with the surname include:

- Tommaso Vincenzi (died 1478), Italian Roman Catholic Bishop of Pesaro (1475–1478) and Bishop of Terni (1472–1475)
- Giacomo Vincenzi (died 1619), Italian bookseller and music printer from Venice, also known as Giacomo Vincenti
- Alfredo Ciriaco De Vincenzi (1907–date of death unknown), Italian Argentine professional football player
- Francesco Vincenzi (born 1956), Italian footballer and manager
- Giorgio De Vincenzi (1884–1965), Italian painter and etcher
- Giovanni Vincenzi (1905–1970), Italian footballer
- Guido Vincenzi (1932–1997), Italian footballer
- Marta Vincenzi (born 1947), Italian politician
- Penny Vincenzi (1939-2018), British novelist
