= Vikentije =

- Gender: Male

Origin
- Origin: Latin nomen Vincentius
- Region of origin: Italy

Vikentije or Vićentije is the Serbian variant of the Latin name Vincentius, meaning "winner" or "conqueror".

- Serbian Patriarch Vikentije I, Archbishop of Peć and Serbian Patriarch (1758)
- Serbian Patriarch Vikentije II, Archbishop of Peć and Serbian Patriarch (1950–1958)
- Vikentije Popović, Metropolitan of Karlovci (1713–1725)
- Vikentije Jovanović, Metropolitan of Belgrade and Karlovci (1731–1737)
- Vićentije Jovanović Vidak, Metropolitan of Sremski Karlovci (1774–1780)
- Vićentije Vićenco Vuković (fl. 1560–71), Serbian printer and editor in Venice

== See also ==
- Vićentijević
