= Virginia Poffenberger =

American politician

Virginia Joy Poffenberger was an American politician.

Virginia Joy was a native of Perry, Iowa, born to parents Charles and Lorraine on 12 November 1934. Joy attended Iowa State University, graduating with a degree in home economics in 1957, and was later employed at Drake University. She married Richard Poffenberger shortly after completing her undergraduate degree. The couple raised three children. After her children had graduated from high school, Poffenberger returned to Drake as a student. She earned a Juris Doctor from Drake University Law School in 1978, and began practicing law alongside relatives in Perry. Poffenberger was a Republican member of the Iowa House of Representatives from District 57 between 1979 and 1983. The Poffenbergers retired to Tierra Verde, Florida, in 1999. She died on 3 October 2013.

Poffenberger was a Methodist.
