= Jérémy Baillard =

French bobsledder

Personal information
- Nationality: French
- Born: 4 February 1990 (age 36) Enghien-les-Bains, France
- Height: 1.87 m (6 ft 2 in)
- Weight: 106 kg (234 lb)

Sport
- Country: France
- Sport: Bobsleigh (driver)

Jérémy Baillard (born 4 February 1990 in Enghien-les-Bains) is a French bobsledder.

Baillard competed at the 2014 Winter Olympics for France. He teamed with driver Thibault Godefroy, Vincent Ricard and Jérémie Boutherin in the France-2 sled in the four-man event, finishing 23rd.

As of April 2014, his best showing at the World Championships is 23rd, coming in the two-man event in 2012.
