= Don Alt =

American politician and businessman (1916–1988)

Member of the Iowa House of Representatives from the 61st district
- In office January 11, 1971 – January 7, 1973
- Succeeded by: Richard L. Byerly

Member of the Iowa House of Representatives from the 37th district
- In office January 13, 1969 – January 10, 1971
- Succeeded by: Bill Hansen

Personal details
- Born: Don D. Alt; December 15, 1916 St. Joseph, Missouri, U.S.
- Died: August 18, 1988 (aged 71) Las Cruces, New Mexico, U.S.
- Party: Republican
- Spouse: Isabel Greenberg (m. 1941–1983)
- Children: 3
- Education: Drake University; Iowa State University
- Occupation: Politician, businessman

Military service
- Allegiance: United States
- Branch/service: United States Army
- Rank: Captain
- Battles/wars: World War II

Don D. Alt (December 15, 1916 – August 18, 1988) was an American politician and businessman.

Born in St. Joseph, Missouri, Alt went to the Des Moines, Iowa public schools and graduated from Roosevelt High School. He served in the United States Army during World War II. Alt went to Drake University and Iowa State University. He worked at the Home Federal Loan and Savings in Des Moines and was a vice-president. Alt served in the Iowa House of Representatives from 1969 to 1973 and was a Republican. In 1985, Alt moved to Las Cruces, New Mexico. He died in Las Cruces, New Mexico.
