= Nancy Dunkel =

American politician (born 1955)

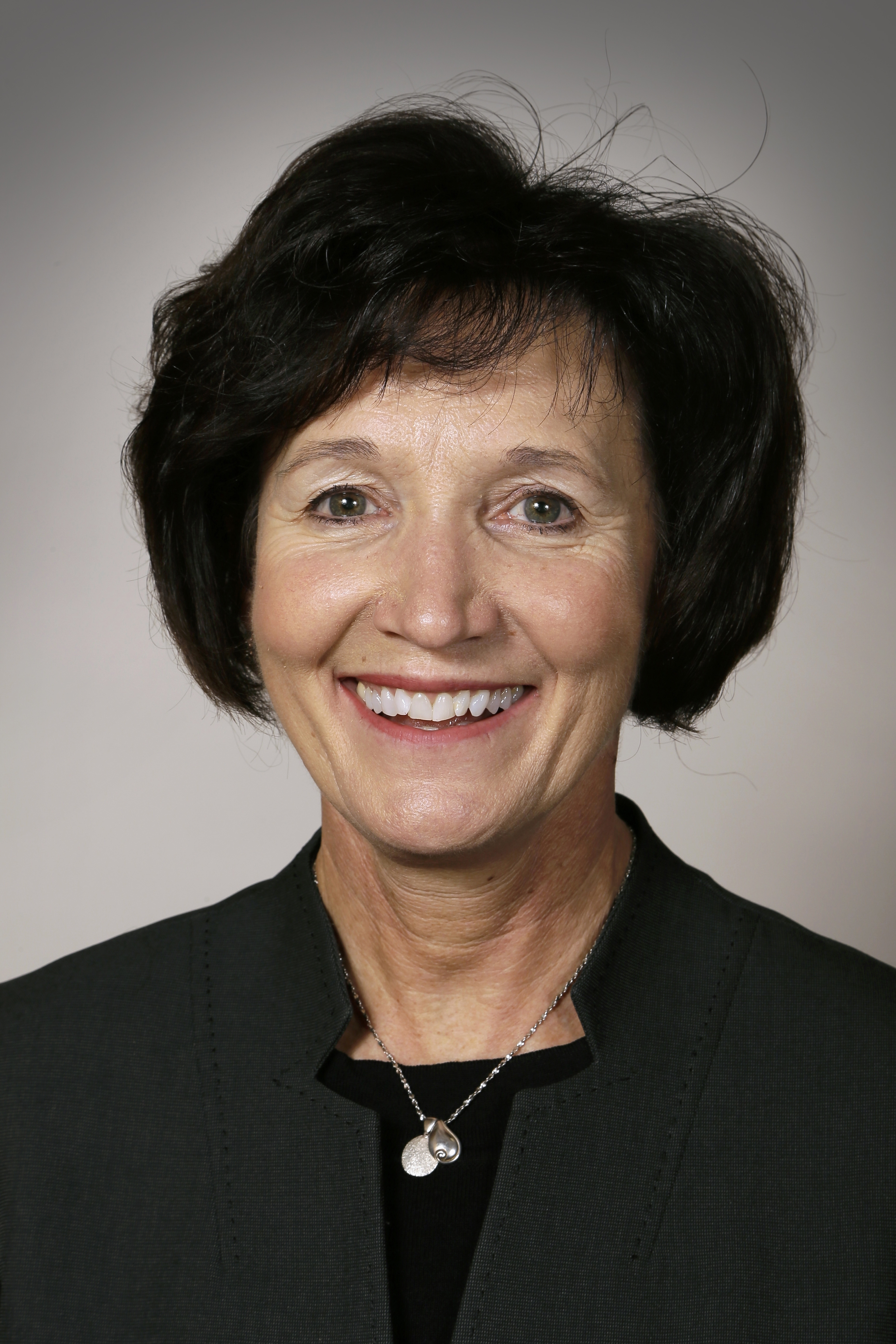
- Dunkel in 2015

Member of the Iowa House of Representatives from the 57th district
- In office 14 January 2013 – 8 January 2017
- Preceded by: Jack Drake
- Succeeded by: Shannon Lundgren

Personal details
- Born: 1955 (age 70–71) Manchester, Iowa, U.S.
- Party: Democratic
- Occupation: banker

Nancy A. Dunkel (born 1955) is an American politician. Dunkel was born in 1955 in Manchester, Iowa. She was raised in Earlville and attended Loras College. Dunkel later moved to Dyersville, where she worked as a banker and in retirement, led the Dyersville Area Community Foundation. In 2011, Dunkel was elected to the Iowa Women's Hall of Fame.

Politically, Dunkel is affiliated with the Democratic Party. She ran unopposed for the open seat in District 57 of the Iowa House of Representatives in 2012, as the incumbent officeholder Jack Drake was redistricted. Dunkel defeated Republican candidate Ryan Kilburg and Libertarian candidate David Snowden Overby in 2014. After stepping down from the state legislature, Dunkel accepted a gubernatorial appointment to serve on the Iowa Board of Regents in 2017. The Iowa Senate voted unanimously to approve Dunkel's appointment.
