= Tami Wiencek =

American politician

Tamorah J. Wiencek
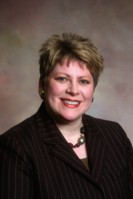

Member of the Iowa House of Representatives from the 21st district
- In office January 8, 2007 – January 11, 2009
- Preceded by: Don Shoultz
- Succeeded by: Kerry Burt

Personal details
- Born: 1969 (age 56–57) Chicago, Illinois
- Party: Republican
- Education: Drake University
- Occupation: Public Relations Consultant
- Website: Wiencek's official website

Tami Wiencek (born 1969) is a former member of the Iowa legislature, representing the 21st District in the Iowa House of Representatives from 2007 to 2009.

Wiencek served on several committees in the Iowa House - the Economic Growth, Education, and Ways and Means committees. She also served on the Administration and Regulation Appropriations Subcommittee.

Wiencek was elected in 2006, defeating Democratic incumbent Don Shoultz, despite the fact that 2006 was a very favorable election year for Iowa Democrats. However, she was defeated by Democrat Kerry Burt in the following 2008 elections.

Prior to her political career, she worked as a reporter/anchor on KWWL-TV in Waterloo. In 2005, she worked for Beecher & Wiencek Public Relations, a public relations firm.

== Electoral history ==
*incumbent

Election	Political result	Candidate	Party	Votes	%
Iowa House of Representatives elections, 2006; District 21; Turnout: 9,318	Republican gain from Democratic	Tami Wiencek	Republican	4,802	51.5
Iowa House of Representatives elections, 2006; District 21; Turnout: 9,318	Republican gain from Democratic	Don Shoultz*	Democratic	4,504	48.3
Iowa House of Representatives elections, 2008; District 21; Turnout: 13,141	Democratic gain from Republican	Kerry Burt	Democratic	6,673	50.8
Iowa House of Representatives elections, 2008; District 21; Turnout: 13,141	Democratic gain from Republican	Tami Wiencek*	Republican	6,454	49.1

Iowa House of Representatives
Preceded by Don Shoultz	21st District; 2007 – 2009	Succeeded by Kerry Burt
