= Scott Ourth =

American politician

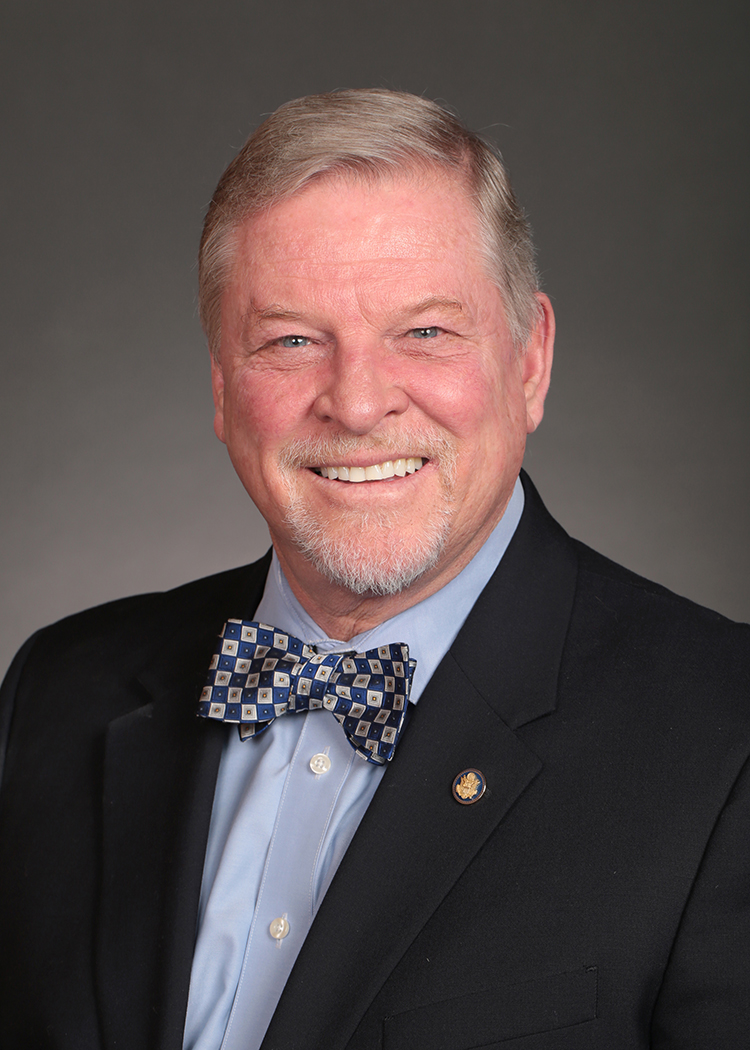

Member of the Iowa House of Representatives from the 26th district
- In office January 14, 2013 – January 10, 2021
- Preceded by: Glen Massie
- Succeeded by: Brooke Boden

Personal details
- Born: February 7, 1959 (age 67) Columbia, Missouri, U.S.
- Party: Democratic
- Children: 1
- Education: Graceland College; Central Michigan University
- Website: legis.iowa.gov/...

Scott Douglas Ourth (born February 7, 1959) was the Iowa State Representative from the 26th District. A Democrat, he served in the Iowa House of Representatives from 2013 to 2021. Ourth lives in Indianola, Iowa. He attended Central Michigan University and graduated from Graceland College.

Scott is a past vice-president of the Disability Rights Iowa Board of Directors and has served on the Graceland University Alumni Board of Directors. He has received the American Cancer Society Distinguished Service Award and the American Heart Association Director's Award. He has served on the Warren County Leadership Institute Board of Directors and is a member of the Indianola Noon Lion's Club.

As of January 2021, Ourth served on several committees in the Iowa House – the Agriculture, Economic Growth, and Natural Resources committees. He also served as a member of the Agriculture and Natural Resources Appropriations Subcommittee.

Scott Ourth lives in Indianola, Iowa. He is an active member of the Community of Christ Church and is an accomplished outdoorsman.

== Electoral history ==
Election	Political result	Candidate	Party	Votes	%
Iowa House of Representatives primary elections, 2010; District 74	Democratic	Scott Ourth	Democratic	unopposed	
Iowa House of Representatives general elections, 2010; District 74; Turnout: 14,692	Republican hold	Glen H. Massie*	Republican	7,472	50.86%
Iowa House of Representatives general elections, 2010; District 74; Turnout: 14,692	Republican hold	Scott Ourth	Democratic	6,520	44.38%
Iowa House of Representatives primary elections, 2012; District 26	Democratic	Scott Ourth	Democratic	unopposed	
Iowa House of Representatives general elections, 2012; District 26; Turnout: 17,089	Democratic (newly redistricted)	Scott Ourth	Democratic	8,452	51.97%
Iowa House of Representatives general elections, 2012; District 26; Turnout: 17,089	Democratic (newly redistricted)	Steve McCoy	Republican	7,758	47.70%

*Denotes incumbent

Iowa House of Representatives
Preceded by Mary Wolfe	26th District; 2013–present	Succeeded by Incumbent
