= Timi Brown-Powers =

American politician

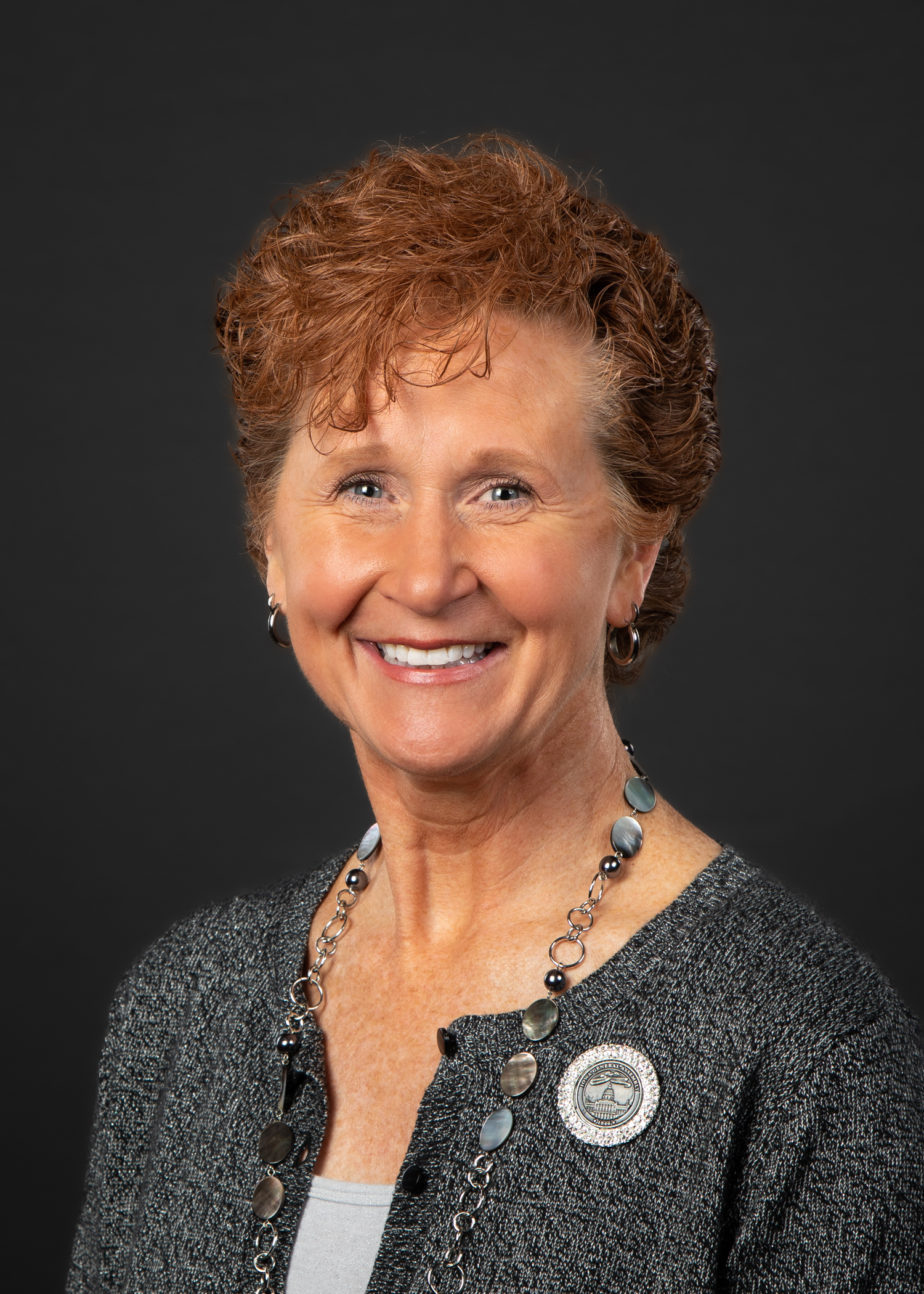

Member of the Iowa House of Representatives from the 61st district
- Incumbent
- Assumed office January 12, 2015
- Preceded by: Anesa Kajtazovic
- Succeeded by: Vincent Collis (elect)

Personal details
- Born: 1967 (age 58–59) Yuba County, California, U.S.
- Party: Democratic
- Spouse: Tim
- Children: 1
- Education: University of Northern Iowa (BA)
- Occupation: Medical therapist
- Website: Official

Timi Brown-Powers (born 1967) is an American therapist and politician serving as a member of the Iowa House of Representatives, representing District 61. She was first elected to the House in 2014.

== Early life and education ==
Timi Brown-Powers was born at Beale Air Force Base in Yuba County, California and raised in the Beaverdale neighborhood of Des Moines, Iowa. Her father worked at the Firestone plant while her mother ran a business out of their home and worked for the Des Moines public schools. Her experiences with her grandmother, a paraplegic, led her to volunteer for programs that help students with disabilities. She graduated from Herbert Hoover High School and attended Des Moines Area Community College for a year. She then moved to Waterloo to attend the University of Northern Iowa, where she earned a Bachelor of Arts in therapeutic recreation.

== Career ==
As a student at the University of Northern Iowa, Brown-Powers worked as a certified nursing assistant. She then worked as a therapist for Covenant Medical Center in Waterloo for over 25 years.

Brown-Powers announced her candidacy for Anesa Kajtazovic's seat in the Iowa House of Representatives on March 8, 2014 at the Black Hawk County Democratic Convention. She was endorsed by Americans for Democratic Action. She defeated Brad Condon and Andrew Miller in the Democratic primary.

Brown-Powers earned 59% of the vote in the general election, defeating Republican Nathan Bolton's 40%.

=== Committee assignments ===
As of January 2026, Brown-Powers serves on the following committees in the Iowa House:

- Higher Education (ranking member)
- Federal and Other Funds Appropriations Subcommittee (ranking member)
- Environmental Protection
- Health and Human Services
- Public Safety

Iowa House of Representatives
Preceded by Anesa Kajtazovic	61st District; 2015–present	Succeeded by Incumbent
