= Thibault Godefroy =

French bobsledder

Personal information
- Nationality: French
- Born: 28 February 1985 (age 40) Bordeaux, France
- Height: 1.85 m (6 ft 1 in)
- Weight: 98 kg (216 lb)

Sport
- Country: France
- Sport: Bobsleigh (driver)

Thibault Godefroy (born 28 February 1985 in Bordeaux) is a French bobsledder.

Godefroy competed at the 2014 Winter Olympics for France. He teamed with Vincent Ricard, Jérémy Baillard and Jérémie Boutherin in the France-2 sled in the four-man event, finishing 23rd.

As of April 2014, his best showing at the World Championships was 23rd, which came in the two-man event in 2012.

Godefroy made his World Cup debut in December 2011. As of April 2014, his best finish was 18th, in a two-man event in 2011-12.
