= Daniel Peterson =

Daniel Peterson may refer to:

- Daniel Peterson (physician), American physician known for the treatment of Myalgic encephalomyelitis/chronic fatigue syndrome
- Daniel C. Peterson (born 1953), professor of Islamic Studies and Arabic at Brigham Young University
- Dan Peterson (born 1936), former American professional basketball head coach
- Dan Peterson (politician) (1940–2025), Canadian politician

== See also ==
- Daniel Petersen (disambiguation)
- Daniel Pettersson
