= Iowa's 50th House of Representatives district =

American legislative district

House District 50
- Type: District of the Lower house
- Location: Iowa
- Representative: Pat Grassley
- Parent organization: Iowa General Assembly

The 50th District of the Iowa House of Representatives in the state of Iowa is part of Story County.

== Current elected officials ==
Ross Wilburn is the representative currently representing the district.

== Past representatives ==
The district has previously been represented by:

- Charles Balloun, 1961–1965
- Theodore R. Ellsworth, 1971–1973
- Willis E. Junker, 1973–1979
- James D. O'Kane, 1979–1983
- Philip E. Brammer, 1983–1989
- Joyce Nielsen, 1989–1993
- David Osterberg, 1993–1995
- Lynn S. Schulte, 1995–1997
- Ro Foege, 1997–2003
- Dave Tjepkes, 2003–2013
- Pat Grassley, 2013–2023
- Ross Wilburn, 2023–present
