= Vincenc =

Vincenc is a Czech masculine given name, equivalent to English Vincent. Notable people with the name include:

- Vincenc Beneš (1883–1979), Czech painter
- Vincenc Lesný (1882–1953), Czech indologist
- Vincenc Makovský (1900–1966), Czech sculptor and industrial designer
- Vincenc Morstadt (1802–1875), Czech painter and illustrator
- Vincenc Prasek (1843–1912), Czech linguist and educator
- Vincenc Strouhal (1850–1922), Czech physicist
- Marko Vincenc Lipold (1816–1883), Slovenian geologist
