= Vincențiu =

- Gender: Male

Origin
- Origin: Latin nomen Vincent
- Region of origin: Italy

Vincențiu is a Romanian given name

- Vincențiu Babeș (1821–1907) ethnic Romanian lawyer, teacher, journalist and politician from the Banat
- Vincențiu Grifoni, Romanian bishop
