= Vinko =

- Gender: Male

Origin
- Origin: Latin nomen Vincent
- Region of origin: Italy

Vinko is a masculine name related to Vincent, and may refer to:

== Given name ==
- Frane Vinko Golem (1938–2007), Croatian diplomat and politician
- Vinko Begović (born 1948), Croatian football coach
- Vinko Bogataj (born 1950), former ski jumper from Slovenia
- Vinko Brešan (born 1964), Croatian film director
- Vinko Coce (1954–2013), Croatian singer
- Vinko Dvořák (1848–1922), Czech-Croatian physicist, professor and rector of Zagreb University
- Vinko Globokar (born 1934), avant-garde composer and trombonist of Slovene descent
- Vinko Golob (1921–1995), Bosnian football player
- Vinko Knežević (1755–1832), Austrian general of the Napoleonic Wars
- Vinko Ošlak (born 1947), Slovene author, essayist, translator, columnist and esperantist from the Austrian state Carinthia
- Vinko Pintarić (1941–1991), Croatian serial killer
- Vinko Pribojević (born mid-15th century), Croatian historian, ideologue and founder of the pan-Slavic ideology
- Vinko Puljić (born 1945), Bosnian Croat Cardinal of the Roman Catholic Church
- Vinko Žganec (1890–1976), Croatian ethnomusicologist

== Surname ==
- Vedran Vinko (born 1990), Slovenian footballer

== See also ==
- Vinco (disambiguation)
