= Brooke Boden =

American politician

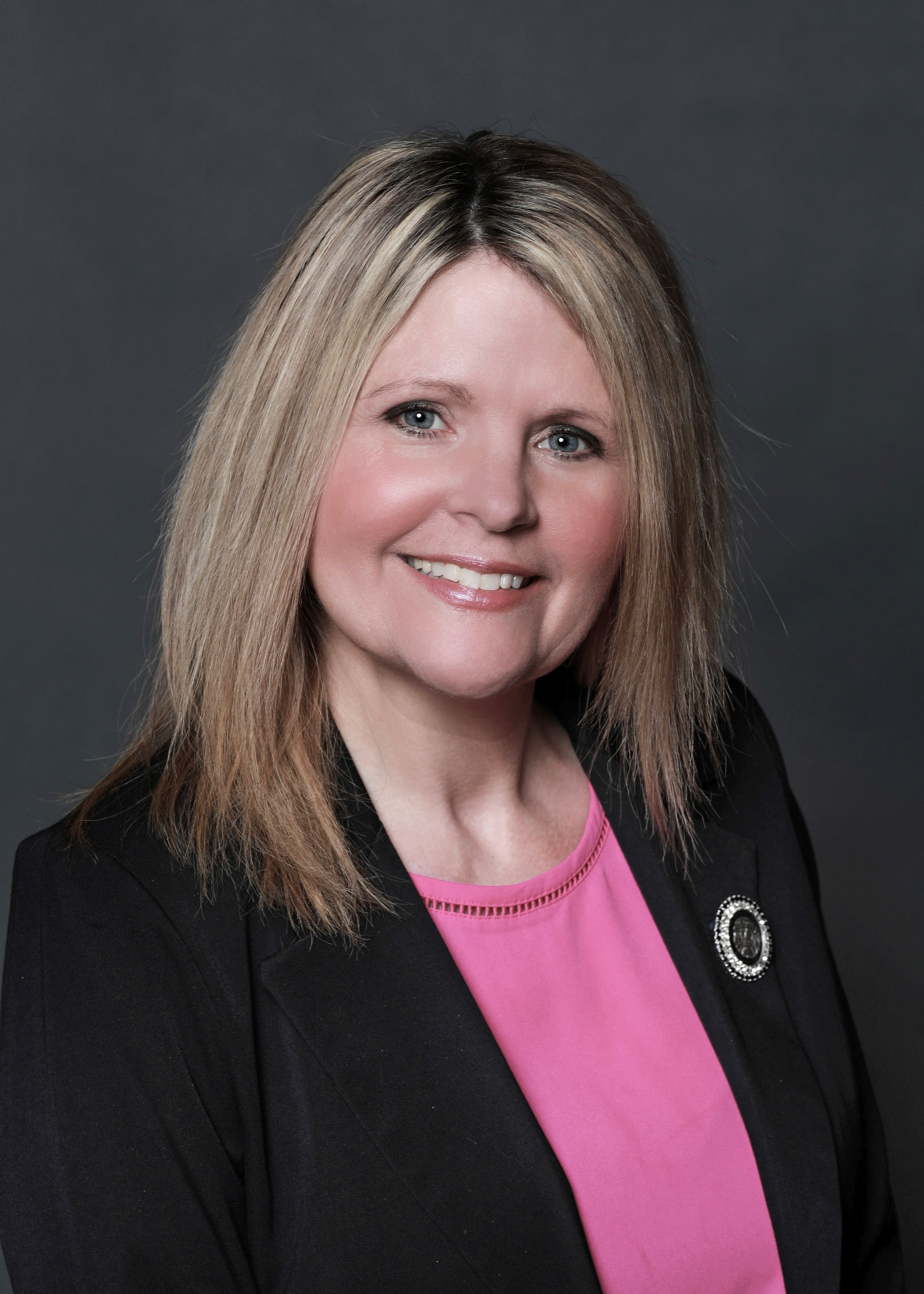
- Boden in 2021

Member of the Iowa House of Representatives from the 21st district
- Incumbent
- Assumed office 11 January 2021
- Preceded by: Scott Ourth

Personal details
- Party: Republican
- Spouse: Adam
- Children: 3
- Website: legis.iowa.gov/...

Brooke Boden (born 1973) is an American politician. She has served as a member of the Iowa House of Representatives from District 21 since 2021 and as a Republican.

== Personal life ==
Boden was born in Indianola, Iowa, in 1973, and attended Indianola High School. She and her husband Adam raised three children.

== Business career ==
Prior to pursuing political office, Boden had operated a dance studio for 24 years. While working for National Ballooning Ltd., a hot air balloon manufacturer owned by her family, Boden attained a repairman certificate, permitting her to inspect and repair hot air balloons. She also holds a license as an insurance agent, and worked as a dental assistant.

== Political career ==
Boden lobbied for legislation supporting Iowa residents with Lyme disease, which passed the Iowa General Assembly in 2017. She later became a co-chair of the Warren County Republican Party.

In 2019, Boden began campaigning for the Iowa House seat held by Scott Ourth. She defeated Ourth in November 2020, winning 9,756 votes to Ourth's 8,411 votes. Boden took office on 11 January 2021, and was named vice chair of the state government committee. In 2022, Boden defeated Joe Kerner in House District 21, and won a third term against Spencer Waugh in 2024.

=== Committee assignments ===
As of January 2026, Boden serves on the following committees in the Iowa House.

- Local Government (chair)
- Education
- Government Oversight
- Ways and Means
- Education Appropriations Subcommittee

Iowa House of Representatives
Preceded by Tom Moore (politician)	21st District; 2023 – present	Succeeded by Incumbent
Preceded by Scott Ourth	26th District; 2021 – 2023	Succeeded by Austin Harris
