= Thomas Gilloon =

American politician (born 1949)

Thomas J. Gilloon Jr. (born September 11, 1949) is an American former politician.

Thomas J. Gilloon Jr. was born in North Arlington, New Jersey, to parents Thomas J. and Margaret Ellen Gilloon. The family moved to Dyersville, Iowa, where Gilloon Sr. practiced law, and the younger Gilloon graduated from Beckman Catholic High School. After enrolling at Loras College, Gilloon participated in the activities of the school's chapter of the Iowa Young Democrats. Gilloon completed his undergraduate degree in political science at the University of Iowa in 1971. While a student at UI, he took part in a protest that led to his arrest in May 1970. Gilloon was elected to the Iowa House of Representatives in 1974 as a Democrat from District 21, and retained the same seat in 1976. By the 1978 party primary cycles, Gilloon had declined to run for a third term.
