= Jérémie Boutherin =

French bobsledder

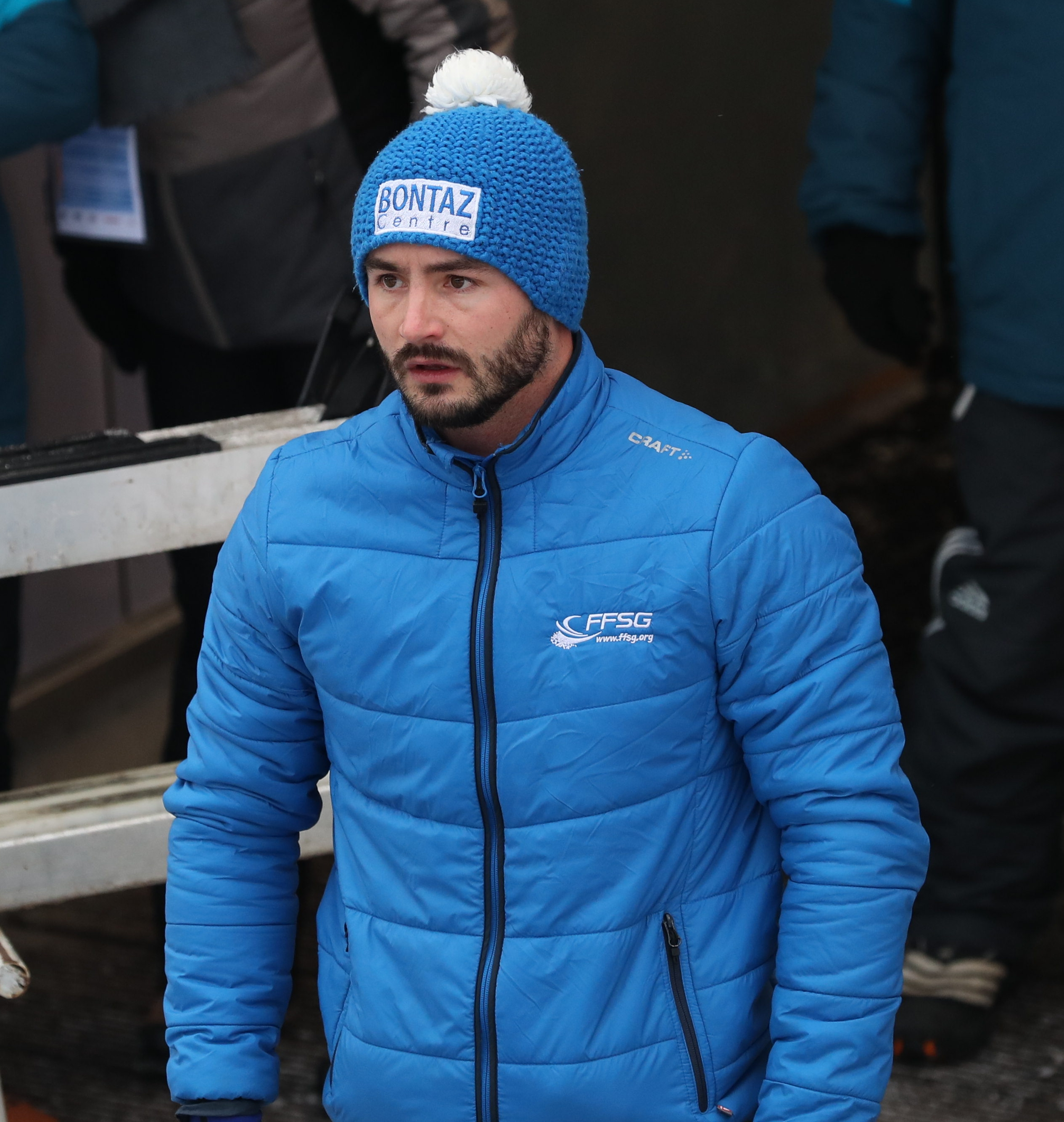

Personal information
- Nationality: French
- Born: 7 August 1988 (age 37) Grenoble, France
- Height: 1.75 m (5 ft 9 in)
- Weight: 77 kg (170 lb)

Sport
- Country: France
- Sport: Bobsleigh (driver)

Jérémie Boutherin (born 7 August 1988 in Grenoble) is a French bobsledder.

Boutherin competed at the 2014 Winter Olympics for France. He teamed with driver Thibault Godefroy, Vincent Ricard and Jérémy Baillard as the France-2 sled in the four-man event, finishing 23rd. As of April 2014, his best showing at the World Championships is 24th, coming in the four-man event in 2013.

Boutherin made his World Cup debut in January 2013. As of April 2014, his best finish is 10th, in a four-man event in 2012–13 at Altenberg.
