= Tom Moore (politician) =

American politician

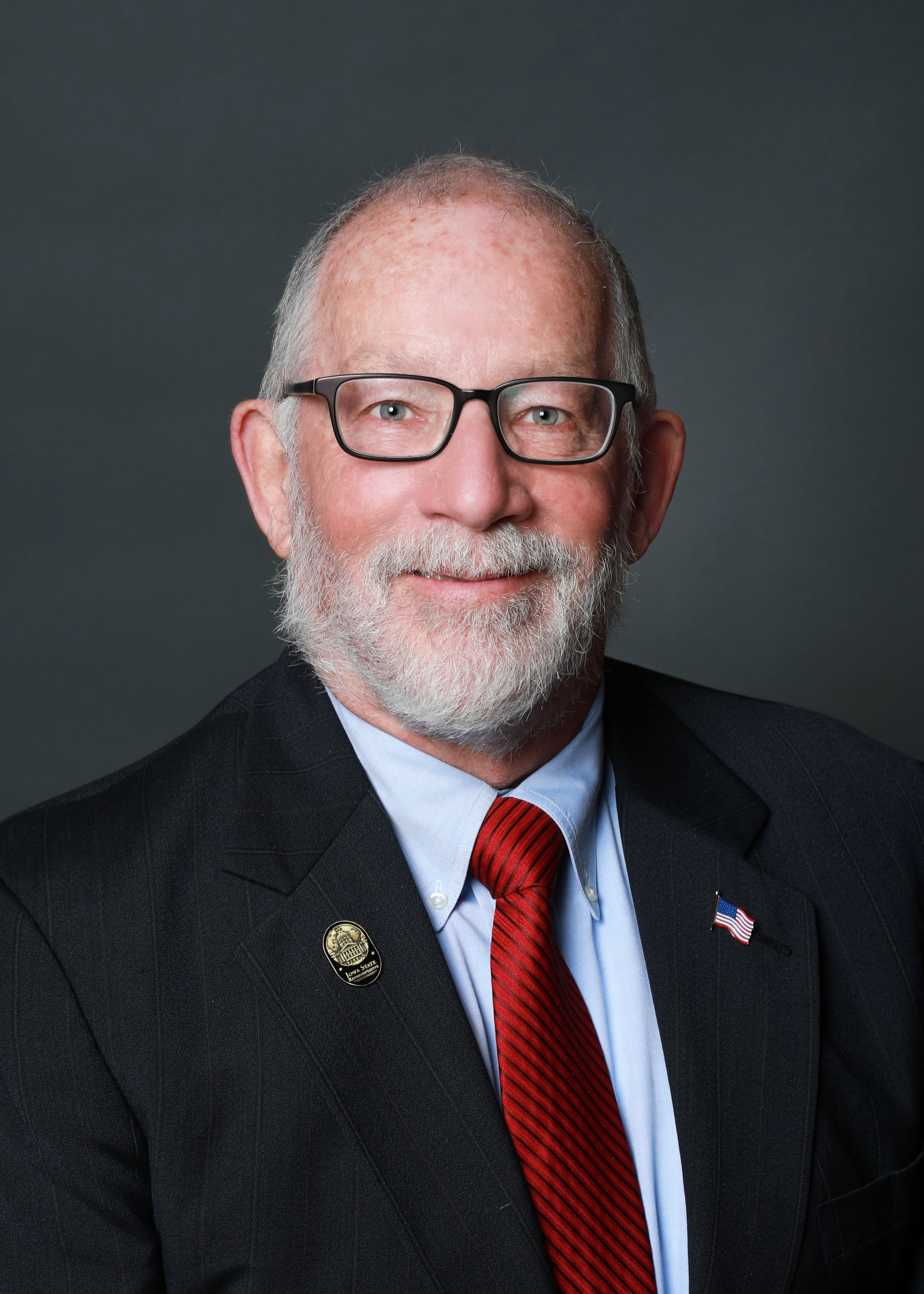
- Moore in 2021

Member of the Iowa House of Representatives from the 18th district
- Incumbent
- Assumed office 2015
- Preceded by: Jack Drake

Personal details
- Born: 1952 (age 73–74) Grinnell, Iowa, U.S.
- Party: Republican
- Spouse: Jewell
- Children: 3
- Education: Northwest Missouri State University, Westmar College
- Profession: educator

Tom Moore (born 1952) is an American politician. He is a Republican who has represented District 18 in the Iowa House of Representatives since 2015.

== Political career ==
Moore was first elected to represent the 21st district in the Iowa House of Representatives in 2015, in a special election to replace Jack Drake, who had died. He has been in that position since.

Moore currently sits on the following committees:

- Education
- Environmental Protection
- Human Resources
- State Government
- Education Appropriations Subcommittee (Vice Chair)

Iowa House of Representatives
Preceded by Steven Holt	18th District; 2023 – present	Succeeded by Incumbent
Preceded by Jack Drake	21st District; 2015 – 2023	Succeeded by Brooke Boden
