= Vincent Ricard =

French bobsledder

Personal information
- Nationality: French
- Born: 2 July 1985 (age 40) Nantes, France
- Height: 1.89 m (6 ft 2 in)
- Weight: 95 kg (209 lb)

Sport
- Country: France
- Sport: Bobsleigh (driver)

Vincent Ricard (born 2 July 1985 in Nantes) is a French bobsledder.

Ricard competed at the 2014 Winter Olympics for France. He teamed with driver Thibault Godefroy, Jérémy Baillard and Jérémie Boutherin in the France-2 sled in the four-man event, finishing 23rd.

As of April 2014, his best showing at the World Championships is 27th, coming in the two-man event in 2011.

Ricard made his World Cup debut in January 2012. As of February 2015, his best finish is 14th, in a four-man event in 2014-15 at La Plagne.
