= Vicko von Geldersen =

Vicko von Geldersen (died 1391) was a cloth merchant, councilor and treasurer in Hamburg.

== Life ==
His date of birth is unknown. A branch of his ancestors lived in Geldersen in the Lüneburg Heath and was closely related to the Elbeke council family from Lüneburg. His mother's brother was Albert Lundeborg (died 1350), who worked as a councilor in Hamburg. Von Geldersen had been married to Katharina Wulkesfeld since 1366, whose father Marquard Wulkesfeld came from Hamburg.

Vicko von Geldersen kept extensive books on his business activities. This includes an accounting book that lists the years from 1367 to 1392 and a rent book that spans the years from 1377 to 1411. The document is in the holdings of the State Archives of the Free and Hanseatic City of Hamburg signature 621-1/133 and was reprinted in edited form by Hans Nirrnheim in 1895. Parts of a debt book from 1360 to 1366 have also been preserved. His sons Johannes and Vicko partly continued the books. Vicko von Geldersen traded in cloths, but was probably not a member of the Hamburg association of clothiers. He bought high-quality fabrics from Flanders, Brabant and England, which he resold in different sizes in Hamburg and Lüneburg. The trading goods of Geldersens also included flax, cotton, linen, wood products and furs. In addition to the commercial transactions, he granted and took loans, commissions and pensions from Geldersen.

In 1367 von Geldersen received a seat on the Hamburg Council. At the Hanseatic Days in 1378 in Lübeck and 1380 in Wismar, he represented Hamburg as a messenger from the council. Von Geldersen was also involved in negotiations in Holland, with Hanseatic cities such as Lüneburg, other sovereigns such as the dukes of Saxe-Lauenburg and the county of Holstein-Rendsburg. For several years he held the post as one of two treasurers. The artisan revolts in 1375 also fell during this period.
