= Steve McLelland =

Scottish footballer

Personal information
- Date of birth: 25 August 1957 (age 69)
- Place of birth: Aberdeen, Scotland
- Height: 6 ft 0 in (1.83 m)
- Positions: Defender; forward

Senior career*
Years	Team	Apps	(Gls)
- Largs Thistle
1977–1980	Ayr United	34	(2)
1979–1982	Motherwell	79	(7)
1982–1983	Hamilton Academical	14	(0)
- Green Gully
Total		127	(9)
- * Club domestic league appearances and goals

Steve McLelland (born 25 August 1957) is a Scottish former professional footballer who played as a defender and forward for Largs Thistle, Ayr United, Motherwell, Hamilton Academical and Green Gully.
