= Kerry Burt =

American politician (1964–2024)

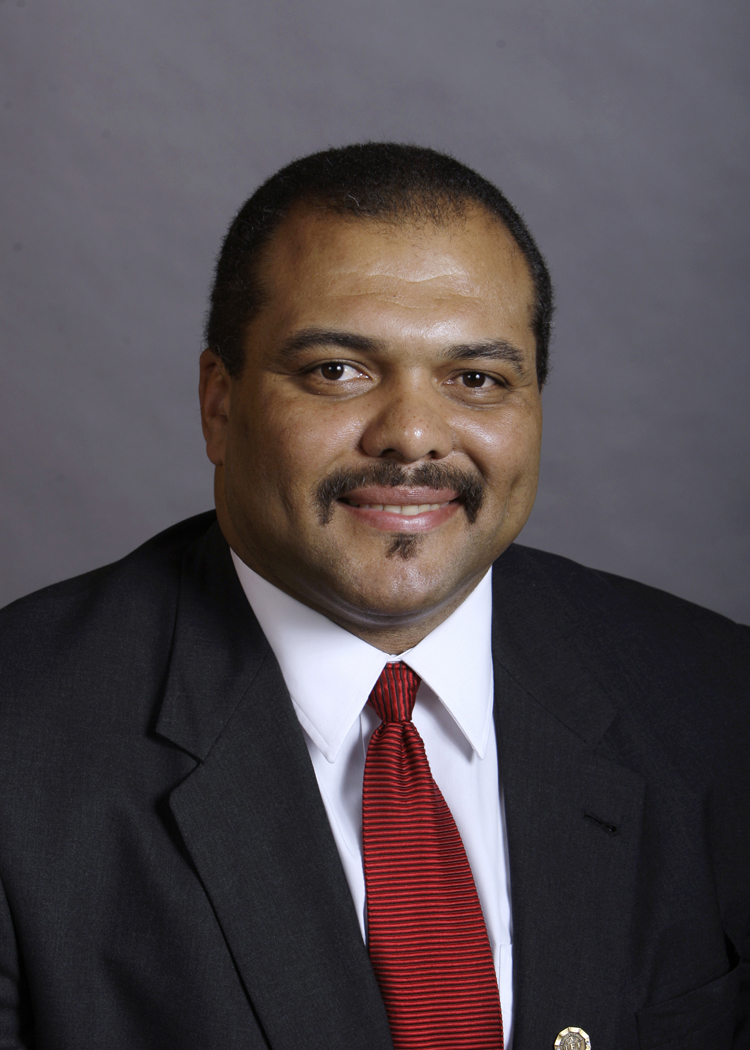

Member of the Iowa House of Representatives from the 21st district
- In office January 12, 2009 – January 10, 2011
- Preceded by: Tami Wiencek
- Succeeded by: Anesa Kajtazovic

Personal details
- Born: December 17, 1964 Waterloo, Iowa, U.S.
- Died: October 1, 2024 (aged 59) Waterloo, Iowa, U.S.
- Party: Democratic
- Education: University of Iowa

Kerry Burt (December 17, 1964 – October 1, 2024) was an American politician from Iowa. He represented the 21st District in the Iowa House of Representatives as a Democrat from 2009 to 2011. He won the election in November 2008 and was sworn in on January 12, 2009. He did not seek re-election in 2010 and was succeeded by Anesa Kajtazovic.

== Life and career ==
Burt played for the Maryland Commandos of the Arena Football League in 1989.

Burt graduated from Waterloo West High School.

Burt was arrested in February 2009 in Ankeny, Iowa after driving drunk and causing an auto accident. He pleaded guilty to the charge.

He took office in January 2009 and, in April 2010, announced that he would not seek re-election for the November 2010 elections because he was legally charged with tampering with school records. Court documents alleged that Burt used an inaccurate home address in Cedar Falls to enroll his child in the school, and that using the address allowed him to avoid paying higher tuition.

Burt died in Waterloo, Iowa on October 1, 2024, at the age of 59.
