= Daniel F. Petersen =

American politician (born 1951)

Daniel F. Petersen (born 23 April 1951) is an American former politician.

Daniel Petersen was born in Davenport, Iowa, to parents Floyd and Mardelle Petersen on 23 April 1951. He was raised in Muscatine, where he graduated from Muscatine High School in 1969, then earned a bachelor's degree from Iowa State University in 1973. Petersen was a farmer.

Petersen was elected to the Iowa House of Representatives in a 1985 special election necessitated after the resignation of Janis Torrence from the District 57 seat. Thereafter, he was elected to three full terms in his own right, serving until 1993.
