= James McClelland =

James McClelland may refer to:

- James McClelland (psychologist) (born 1948), American psychologist and cognitive neuroscientist
- James McClelland (solicitor-general) (c. 1768–1831), Irish politician and Solicitor-General
- James D. McClelland (1848–1919), New York politician
- Jimmy McClelland (1903–1976), Scottish footballer
- Jim McClelland (1915–1999), Australian solicitor, jurist and politician
