= Jack Drake (politician) =

American politician (1934–2015)

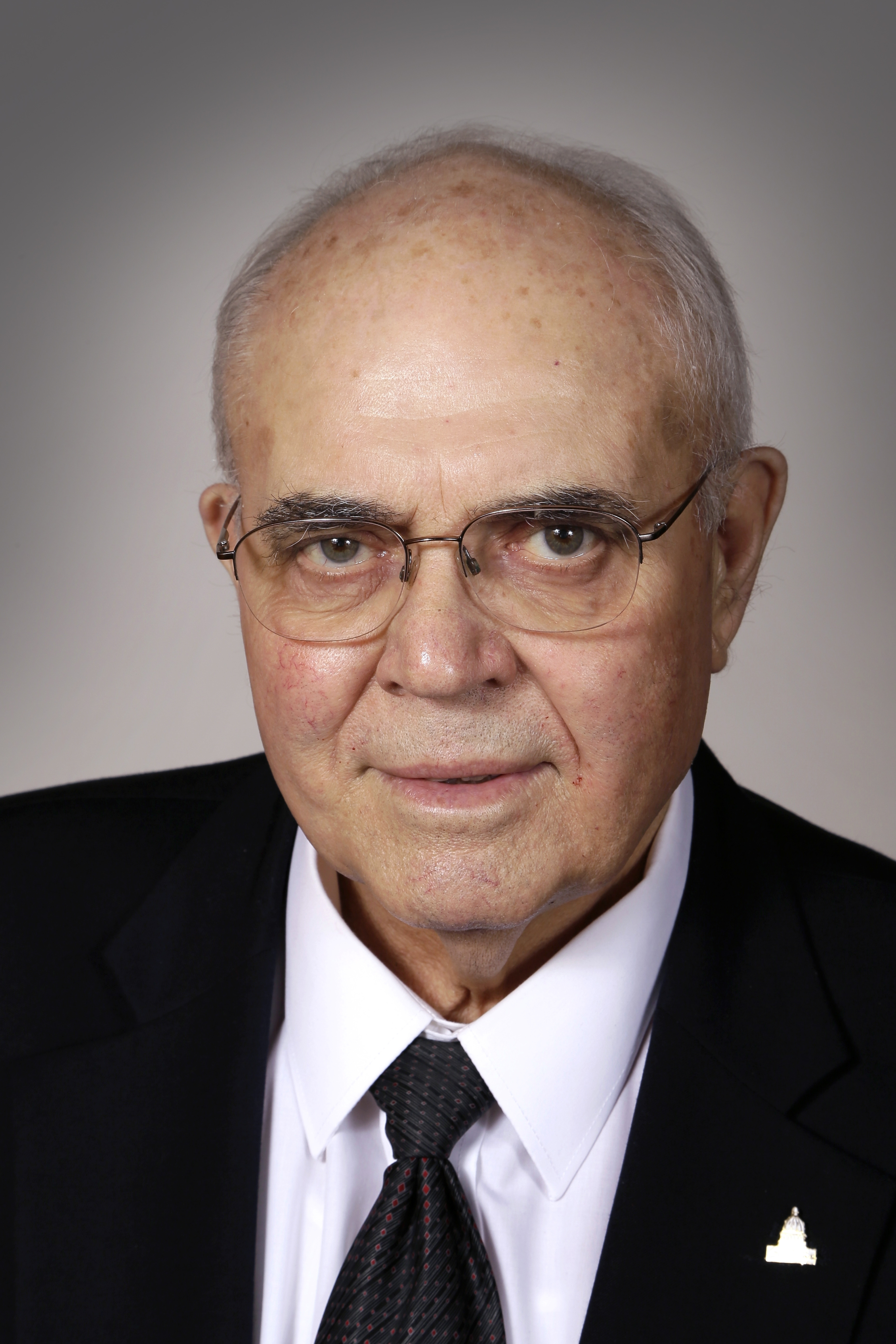

Member of the Iowa House of Representatives from the 21st district 57th (2003–2013) 81st (1993–2003)
- In office 1993–2015
- Preceded by: Jack Hatch
- Succeeded by: Tom Moore

Personal details
- Born: July 29, 1934 Walnut, Iowa, U.S.
- Died: October 11, 2015 (aged 81) Atlantic, Iowa, U.S.
- Party: Republican
- Spouse: Shirley
- Children: 4
- Education: University of Iowa
- Profession: Farmer
- Website: Drake's website

Jack Edwin Drake (July 29, 1934 – October 11, 2015) was an American politician in the Iowa State Representative from the 21st District. A Republican, he served in the Iowa House of Representatives from 1993 until his death. Drake was born and raised near Walnut, Iowa, and lived in Griswold. Drake attended the University of Iowa.

As of January 2013, Drake served on several committees in the Iowa House – the Agriculture, Appropriations, and State Government committees. He also served as the chair of the Agriculture and Natural Resources Appropriations Subcommittee.

== Biography ==
Drake was first elected in 1992. He was born on July 29, 1934, in Walnut, Iowa. His father, Wallace, and mother, Arlene, were both farmers. He attended grade school at Lincoln #2 Country School in Walnut. He graduated from Atlantic High School. Following graduation, he attended the University of Iowa.

In 1954, he married his wife, Shirley, and together they have raised four children, three of which still live in SW Iowa. The fourth lives in Nevada, Iowa. He and his wife Shirley have eleven grandchildren, and nine great-grandchildren

Drake attended Griswold United Methodist Church. He was the chair of the finance committee and served on the audit committee. He was a former Sunday school teacher

He was board secretary of the Walnut Telephone Company. In addition, he was an active member of the Corn Growers Association, Soybean Association, NFIB, and Iowa Farm Bureau.

He was a former board member of the Pottawattamie County Zoning Board; the former president of the East Pottawattamie County Farm Bureau; and the former president of the Pottawattamie County Extension Council. Drake was active in 4-H and served as a leader of the organization at one time. Drake died on October 11, 2015, in hospital at Atlantic, Iowa.

== Electoral history ==
*incumbent

81st District contests

Election	Political result	Candidate	Party	Votes	%
Iowa House of Representatives primary elections, 1992; District 81	Republican	Jack Drake	Republican	unopposed	
Iowa House of Representatives general elections, 1992; District 81; Turnout: 12,393	Republican (newly redistricted)	Jack Drake	Republican	6,385	51.52%
Iowa House of Representatives general elections, 1992; District 81; Turnout: 12,393	Republican (newly redistricted)	Joyce Rodenborn	Democratic	6,008	48.48%
Iowa House of Representatives primary elections, 1994; District 81	Republican	Jack Drake*	Republican	unopposed	
Iowa House of Representatives general elections, 1994; District 81; Turnout: 10,332	Republican hold	Jack Drake*	Republican	5,611	54.31%
Iowa House of Representatives general elections, 1994; District 81; Turnout: 10,332	Republican hold	Blane Kerkhoff	Democratic	4,718	45.66%
Iowa House of Representatives primary elections, 1996; District 81	Republican	Jack Drake*	Republican	unopposed	
Iowa House of Representatives general elections, 1996; District 81; Turnout: 11,860	Republican hold	Jack Drake*	Republican	7,002	59.04%
Iowa House of Representatives general elections, 1996; District 81; Turnout: 11,860	Republican hold	Marcus Gross	Democratic	4,853	40.92%
Iowa House of Representatives primary elections, 1998; District 81	Republican	Jack Drake*	Republican	unopposed	
Iowa House of Representatives general elections, 1998; District 81; Turnout: 9,353	Republican hold	Jack Drake*	Republican	6,115	65.38%
Iowa House of Representatives general elections, 1998; District 81; Turnout: 9,353	Republican hold	Joyce Schulte	Democratic	3,237	34.61%
Iowa House of Representatives primary elections, 2000; District 81	Republican	Jack Drake*	Republican	unopposed	
Iowa House of Representatives general elections, 2000; District 81; Turnout: 13,027	Republican hold	Jack Drake*	Republican	8,359	65.17%
Iowa House of Representatives general elections, 2000; District 81; Turnout: 13,027	Republican hold	Jack Ryan	Democratic	4,665	35.81%

Early 57th District contests

Election	Political result	Candidate	Party	Votes	%
Iowa House of Representatives primary elections, 2002; District 57	Republican	Jack Drake*	Republican	unopposed	
Iowa House of Representatives general elections, 2002; District 57; Turnout: 10,721	Republican (newly redistricted)	Jack Drake*	Republican	6,774	63.18%
Iowa House of Representatives general elections, 2002; District 57; Turnout: 10,721	Republican (newly redistricted)	Donald J. Sonntag	Democratic	3,945	36.80%
Iowa House of Representatives primary elections, 2004; District 57	Republican	Jack Drake*	Republican	unopposed	
Iowa House of Representatives general elections, 2004; District 57	Republican hold	Jack Drake*	Republican	unopposed	
Iowa House of Representatives primary elections, 2006; District 57	Republican	Jack Drake*	Republican	unopposed	
Iowa House of Representatives general elections, 2006; District 57	Republican hold	Jack Drake*	Republican	unopposed	

Election	Political result	Candidate	Party	Votes	%
Iowa House of Representatives primary elections, 2008; District 57	Republican	Jack Drake*	Republican	unopposed	
Iowa House of Representatives general elections, 2008; District 57; Turnout: 14,510	Republican hold	Jack Drake*	Republican	8,317	57.32%
Iowa House of Representatives general elections, 2008; District 57; Turnout: 14,510	Republican hold	Ron Rosmann	Democratic	5,835	40.21%
Iowa House of Representatives primary elections, 2010; District 57	Republican	Jack Drake*	Republican	unopposed	
Iowa House of Representatives general elections, 2010; District 57	Republican hold	Jack Drake*	Republican	unopposed	
Iowa House of Representatives primary elections, 2012; District 21	Republican	Jack Drake*	Republican	unopposed	
Iowa House of Representatives general elections, 2012; District 21; Turnout: 15,433	Republican (newly redistricted)	Jack Drake*	Republican	8,322	53.92%
Iowa House of Representatives general elections, 2012; District 21; Turnout: 15,433	Republican (newly redistricted)	John Rose	Democratic	6,297	40.80%

Iowa House of Representatives
Preceded by Jack Hatch	81st District; 1993–2003	Succeeded by James Van Fossen
Preceded by Paul Bell	57th District; 2003–2013	Succeeded by Nancy Dunkel
Preceded by Anesa Kajtazovic	21st District; 2013–2015	Succeeded by Tom Moore
