= Vincent Ganty =

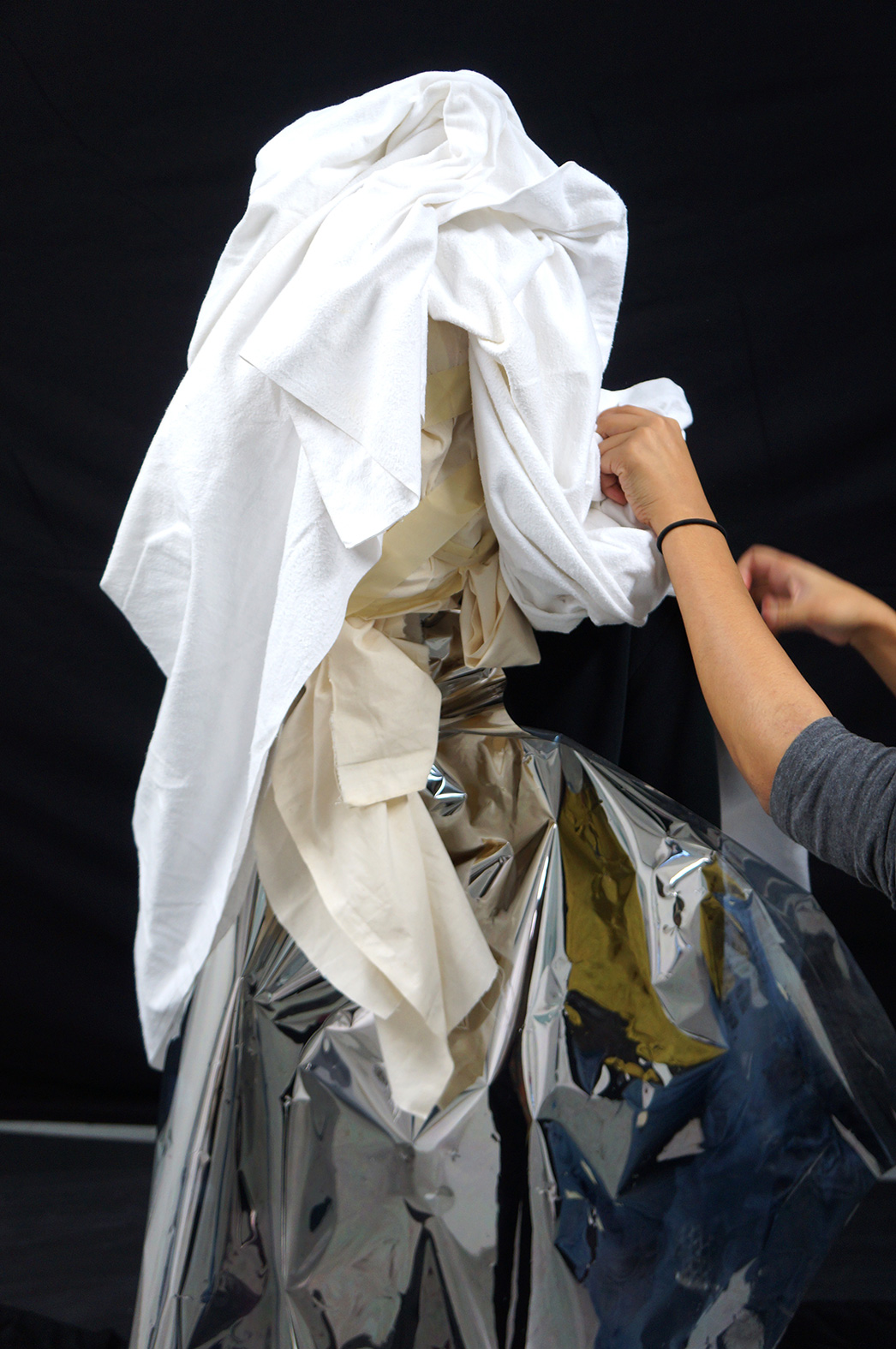
Vincent Ganty

Vincent Ganty (1881–1957) was a political activist born in Cayenne, French Guiana.

== Life ==
He became an orphan at the age of thirteen. This forced him to leave school and to start working as a sailor. During the first forty years of his life he had a number of jobs. He served in the army in the French Foreign Legion and was sent overseas to Madagascar. He was also a fencing teacher and worked for the Douala customs, in Cameroon, of which he became a spokesperson. After some conflicts he was fired but in 1911 he was reinstated to his function.

== Cameroon ==
In 1922, Ganty moved to Cameroon where he continued to have a series of odd jobs, as a masseur, amulet seller, magician and teacher of hypno-magnetism. In 1927 he set up the church La Science Chrétienne du Cameroun, associated with the Christian Science, which provided a shelter for black empowerment activities. This resulted in the formation of a series of groups like Comité de Défense de la Race Nègre and Group Ganty de Défense des Citoyens Nègres Camerounais et Amis des Nègres. In 1930 Ganty moved to Paris and became the self-proclaimed spokesperson for the Cameroonians there. He provided in his living by selling subscriptions of the newspaper, ′Cameroon Republic′ of which he was also the editor.

== Politics ==
After World War II Front inter-coloniale, Comité philanthrope supérieur d’émancipation intégrale et d’initiative générale de la délégation en Europe des Camerounais, Comité philanthrope supérieur pour la défense du Cameroun were set up and sometimes disappeared soon after their foundation. He started sending many letters and petitions to the League of Nations, the precursor the United Nations. His correspondence, which was sometimes hard to follow, was never taken really seriously. But even if his role in independence was ambiguous, nowadays he is remembered as an important figure that paved the road to independence for Cameroon. Ganty died in 1957, three years before Cameroon became independent.
