= Vincent Mendy (basketball) =

French basketball player

Personal information
- Born: 4 May 1983 (age 43) Dakar, Senegal

Career information
- Playing career: 2002–2010
- Position: Center

Career history
- 2002-2005: Nancy
- 2005-2006: Mulhouse
- 2006-2008: Clermont
- 2008-2009: Nanterre
- 2009: Wydad Casablanca
- 2009-2010: Charleville-Mézières
- 2010-2011: Angers
- 2011-2012: Liévin

Vincent Mendy (born 4 May 1983 in Dakar, Senegal) is a French professional basketball player.

== Club career ==
He played in French professional championship from 2002 to 2010.
