= Vincent Collis =

American politician

Member of the Iowa House of Representatives from the 61st district
- Member-elect
- Assumed office January 1, 2027
- Preceded by: Timi Brown-Powers

Personal details
- Party: Democratic
- Education: Seton Hall University
- Website: Campaign website

Vincent Collis is an American politician. A member of the Democratic Party, he was elected to the Iowa House of Representatives in 2026, representing the 61st district. He succeeded fellow Democrat Timi Brown-Powers in the 2026 election.
