= Vinco Corporation =

Manufacturer of tools, fixtures, gauges, and more

Vinco Corporation was a Detroit, Michigan based manufacturer of jig (tool)s, fixtures, gauges, gears, ground tools, index plates, and angle tangents. Before 1940 it was known as the Vinco Tool Company. In 1962 the New York based Recony division of the business produced air conditioners, heating, and ventilating equipment. By 1980 the firm made rocket-engine parts.

Prior to working for the Belock Instrument Corporation in 1957, golfing great Gene Sarazen was in charge of customer relations for the Vinco Corporation.

A company known as Vinco Tool is still operative in Clinton Township, Michigan.
