= Randal McLelland =

2008 United States Olympian, skeet shooting (born 1985)

McLelland, Randal Sean
Personal information
- Born: 17 September 1985 (age 40) Brownsville, Texas, United States
- Height: 5 ft 11 in (1.80 m)
- Weight: 186 lb (84 kg)

Sport
- Sport: International Skeet
- Team: 2008 U.S. Olympic Men's Skeet Team

Achievements and titles
- Personal best: 124/125, 149/150

Randal Sean McLelland (born September 17, 1985) is an International Skeet shooter who competed in the 2008 Summer Olympics.

McLelland began shooting clay targets when he was 14, and he credits Steve Schultz for being the most helpful and influential person in his development and upbringing in the clay target sports. McLelland graduated from Sharyland High School in 2004 and then graduated from Lindenwood University in St. Charles, Mo. in 2008. During his time there, he majored in Business and shot for the nationally ranked Lindenwood University Shotgun team for three National Championship team wins.

Career Highlights
2010 Acapulco World Cup Silver Medalist
2009 Fall Selection Match silver medalist
2008 U.S. Olympic Team Trials (Shotgun), 2nd place
2007 Fall Selection Match silver medalist
2006 Spring Selection Match gold medalist
