= Vincent Alan McClelland =

Church historian

- Born: 1933; United Kingdom
- Died: 10 September 2025 (aged 91–92); Kingston upon Hull
- Occupations: Church historian, author

Academic work
- Institutions: University of Hull

Vincent Alan McClelland (1933–2025) was a British Church historian and author who specialized in the history of the Catholic Church.

McClelland was born in 1933.

His career began at the University of Liverpool, where he was a lecture from 1964 to 1969, at which point he became a professor at the National University of Ireland until 1977. The next year, he became a professor at the University of Hull, where he also served as the Director at the Institute of Education. In 2005, an essay collection in honor of McClelland, entitled Victorian Churches and Churchmen and edited by Sheridan Gilley, was published for the Catholic Record Society.

McClelland was married to Marie McClelland.

He died in Hull Hospital on 10 September 2025.

== Publications ==
- By Whose Authority: Newman, Manning and the Magisterium
- Cardinal Manning: His Public Life and Influence, 1865 - 1892 (1962)
- English Roman Catholics And Their Higher Education, 1830-1903 (1973)

== See also ==
- Catholic Church in the United Kingdom
