= Donald Shoultz =

American politician (1936–2023)

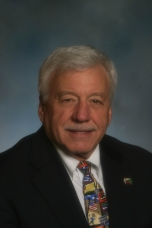

Member of the Iowa House of Representatives
- In office 1983–2007

Personal details
- Born: August 2, 1936 Muscatine, Iowa, U.S.
- Died: May 17, 2023 (aged 86)
- Party: Democratic
- Children: Meghan Shoultz, Lori Shoultz, Greg Shoultz.
- Occupation: Teacher, politician

Donald L. Shoultz (August 2, 1936 – May 17, 2023) was an American politician in the state of Iowa.

== Life and career ==
Shoultz was born in Muscatine, Iowa on August 2, 1936. He attended the University of Northern Iowa and University of Georgia and was a teacher. He served in the Iowa House of Representatives from 1983 to 2007, as a Democrat.

Shoultz died on May 17, 2023, at the age of 86.
