= Robert McClelland =

Robert McClelland may refer to:

- Robert McClelland (American politician) (1807–1880), Governor of Michigan and U.S. Secretary of the Interior
- Robert McClelland (Australian politician) (born 1958), former Australian Attorney-General
- Robert Howard McClelland (1933–2015), politician in British Columbia, Canada
- Robert N. McClelland (1929–2019), American surgeon
