= Anesa Kajtazović =

American politician (born 1986)

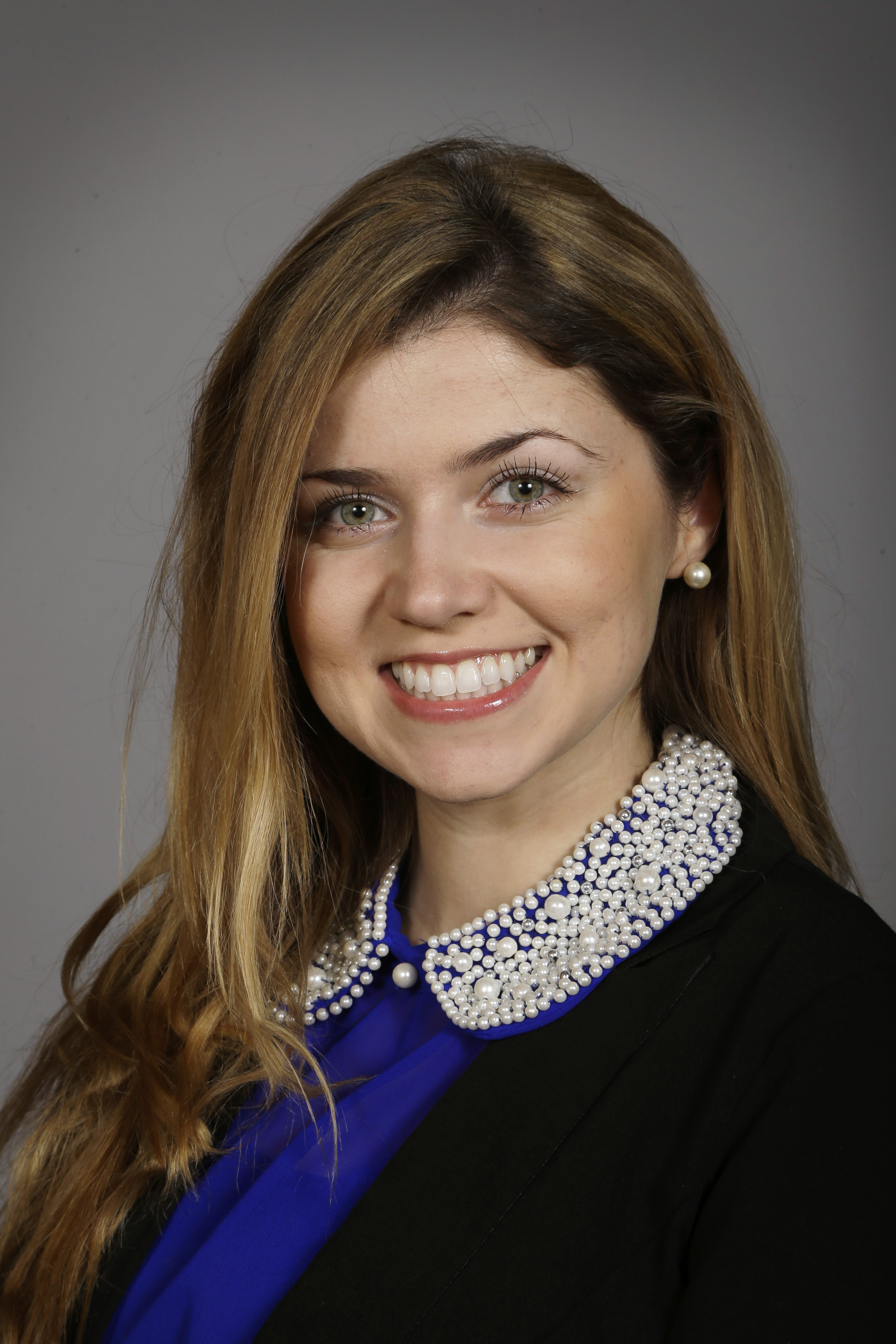

Member of the Iowa House of Representatives from the 61st district
- In office January 10, 2011 – January 11, 2015
- Preceded by: Kerry Burt
- Succeeded by: Timi Brown-Powers

Personal details
- Born: August 30, 1986 (age 40) Bihać, SR Bosnia and Herzegovina, SFR Yugoslavia
- Party: Democratic
- Education: University of Northern Iowa (B.B.A./B.P.A.)
- Profession: Mortgage Analyst

Anesa Kajtazović (born August 30, 1986) is a Bosnian-American politician who served as a member of the Iowa House of Representatives from 2011 to 2015, representing the 61st District. Kajtazovic unsuccessfully ran for Iowa's 1st congressional district in an open seat primary in June 2014.

First elected at age 23, Kajtazovic is the youngest woman ever elected to the Iowa legislature, and the first Bosnian American elected to any public office in the United States.

== Biography ==
Kajtazovic was born in Bihać to Bosnian parents from Velika Kladuša and relocated to the United States in 1997 as a refugee of the Bosnian War.

Kajtazovic graduated from Waterloo West High School in 2004 and the University of Northern Iowa in 2007 with double major in three years, with Bachelor of Business Administration degree and a Bachelor of Public Administration degree.

In the Iowa House of Representatives, she served on the Commerce, Appropriations, Veteran Affairs, Local Government, State Government, Ways and Means and the Economic Development Appropriations subcommittees.

== Electoral history ==
Kajtazovic announced her candidacy in Iowa House of Representatives District 21 in March 2010 as a primary challenge to Kerry Burt, the Democratic incumbent. Burt withdrew from the race in the face of criminal charges, but remained on the ballot as the official withdrawal deadline had passed. Kajtazovic won the June primary with 91% of the vote.

In the November 2010 general election, Kajtazovic won with 59%, defeating Republican opponent John Rooff, a former Waterloo mayor.

In 2012, Kajtazovic was re-elected to the Iowa House of Representatives District 61 (renumbered in redistricting) defeating Republican Lyn Tackett.

2012 Iowa House of Representatives election in District 61
Party	Candidate	Votes	%
Democratic	Anesa Kajtazović	9,602	70.2
Republican	Lyn Tackett	4,063	29.7
n/a	Write-ins	15	0.1
Total votes		13,680	100.0
Democratic hold			

In August 2013, at the age of 26, Kajtazovic announced her candidacy for Iowa's 1st Congressional District. The seat was open as incumbent Democrat Bruce Braley was instead running for an open U.S. Senate seat. Kajtazovic finished fourth of five Democratic candidates in the June 2014 Democratic primary, but carried her home county, Black Hawk.

Democratic primary results
Party	Candidate	Votes	%
Democratic	Pat Murphy	10,189	36.7
Democratic	Monica Vernon	6,559	23.6
Democratic	Swati Dandekar	5,076	18.3
Democratic	Anesa Kajtazović	4,067	14.7
Democratic	Dave O'Brien	1,846	6.7
Democratic	Write-ins	18	0.0
Total votes		27,755	100.0

Because of the congressional campaign, Kajtazovic did not seek re-election to the Iowa House, and was replaced by Democrat Timi Brown-Powers in January 2015.

Iowa House of Representatives
Preceded by Kerry Burt	61st District; 2011–2015	Succeeded by Timi Brown-Powers
