= Timeline of the 2017 Pacific typhoon season =

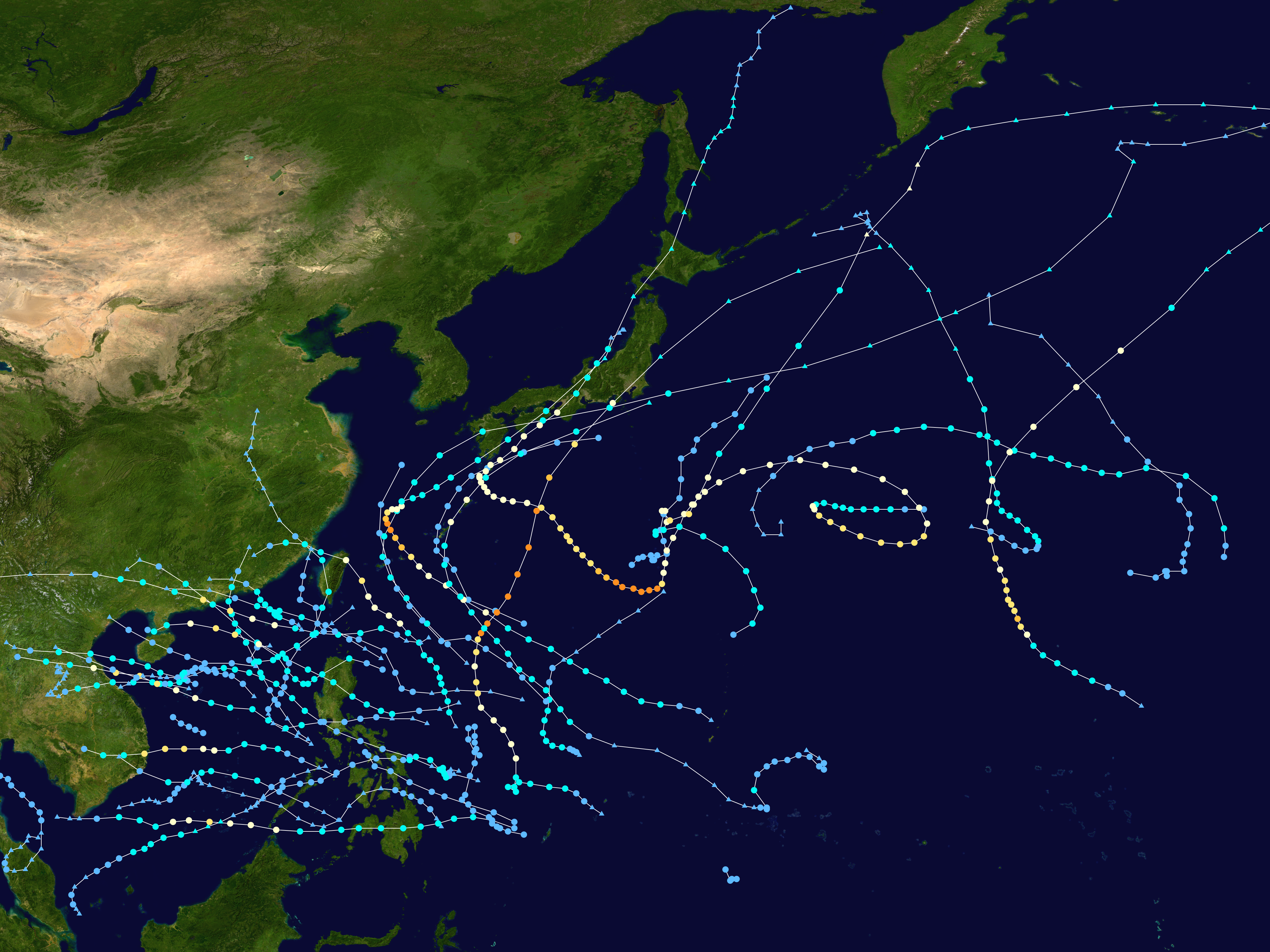
- Season summary map

Season boundaries
- First system formed: January 7, 2017
- Last system dissipated: December 26, 2017 (Note: While Bolaven formed during the 2017 season as being the last system, it was considered to be part of the 2018 Pacific typhoon season, based on the JMA's annual report, thus, Tembin would be the last system of this season while Bolaven would be the first system for the following season.)

Strongest system
- Name: Lan
- Maximum winds: 185 km/h (115 mph) (10-minute sustained)
- Lowest pressure: 915 hPa (mbar)

Longest lasting system
- Name: Noru
- Duration: 20.25 days
Storm articles
- Tropical Depression Auring (2017)
- Tropical Depression Crising (2017)
- Tropical Storm Merbok (2017)
- Tropical Storm Nanmadol (2017)
- Tropical Storm Talas (2017)
- Typhoon Noru (2017)
- Tropical Storm Sonca (2017)
- Typhoon Nesat (2017)
- Typhoon Hato
- Tropical Storm Pakhar (2017)
- Typhoon Talim (2017)
- Typhoon Doksuri (2017)
- October 2017 Vietnam tropical depression
- Typhoon Khanun (2017)
- Typhoon Lan (2017)
- Tropical Depression 26W (2017)
- Typhoon Damrey (2017)
- Tropical Storm Haikui (2017)
- Tropical Storm Kirogi (2017)
- Tropical Storm Kai-tak
- Typhoon Tembin

The 2017 Pacific typhoon season was a below-average season in terms of accumulated cyclone energy and the number of typhoons and super typhoons, and the first since the 1977 season to not produce a Category 5-equivalent typhoon on the Saffir–Simpson scale. The season produced a total of 27 named storms, 11 typhoons, and only two super typhoons, making it an slightly above-average season in terms of storm numbers. It was an event in the annual cycle of tropical cyclone formation, in which tropical cyclones form in the western Pacific Ocean. The season runs throughout 2017, though most tropical cyclones typically develop between May and October. The season's first named storm, Muifa, developed on April 25, while the season's last-named storm, Tembin, dissipated on December 26. This season also featured the latest occurrence of the first typhoon of the year since 1998, with Noru reaching this intensity on July 23.

This timeline documents all of the events of the 2017 Pacific typhoon season. Most of the tropical cyclones forming between May and November. The scope of this article is limited to the Pacific Ocean, north of the equator between 100°E and the International Date Line. During the season, 42 systems were designated as tropical depressions by either, the Japan Meteorological Agency (JMA), the Philippine Atmospheric, Geophysical and Astronomical Services Administration (PAGASA), the United States' Joint Typhoon Warning Center (JTWC), or other National Meteorological and Hydrological Services such as the China Meteorological Administration and the Hong Kong Observatory. As they run the Regional Specialized Meteorological Centre for the Western Pacific, the JMA assigns names to tropical depressions should they intensify into a tropical storm. Tropical depressions that form in this basin are given a number with a "W" suffix by the JTWC. PAGASA also assigns local names to tropical depressions which form within or enter their area of responsibility; however, these names are not in common use outside of PAGASA's area of responsibility. In this season, 22 systems entered or formed in the Philippine Area of Responsibility (PAR), of which 10 of them made landfall over the Philippines, a record-high number since 2009.

== Timeline ==
=== January ===
January 1

- 00:00 UTC — The 2017 Pacific typhoon season officially begins.

January 7

- 00:00 UTC
  - At 8°N 129°E — The JMA classifies a tropical depression located over the Philippine Sea east of Mindanao.
  - (08:00 PHT) at 7.8°N 128.8°E — The PAGASA designates the tropical depression east of Mindanao as Auring.
- 06:00 UTC
  - At 6.4°N 129.6°E — The JMA assesses Auring to have attained 10-minute sustained winds of 30 knots (56 km/h; 35 mph) and a central pressure of 1002 hPa.
  - (14:00 PHT) at 7.8°N 128.4°E — The PAGASA also assesses Auring to have attained 10-minute sustained winds of 55 kilometres per hour (30 kn; 34 mph) but with a lower central pressure of 1000 hPa.

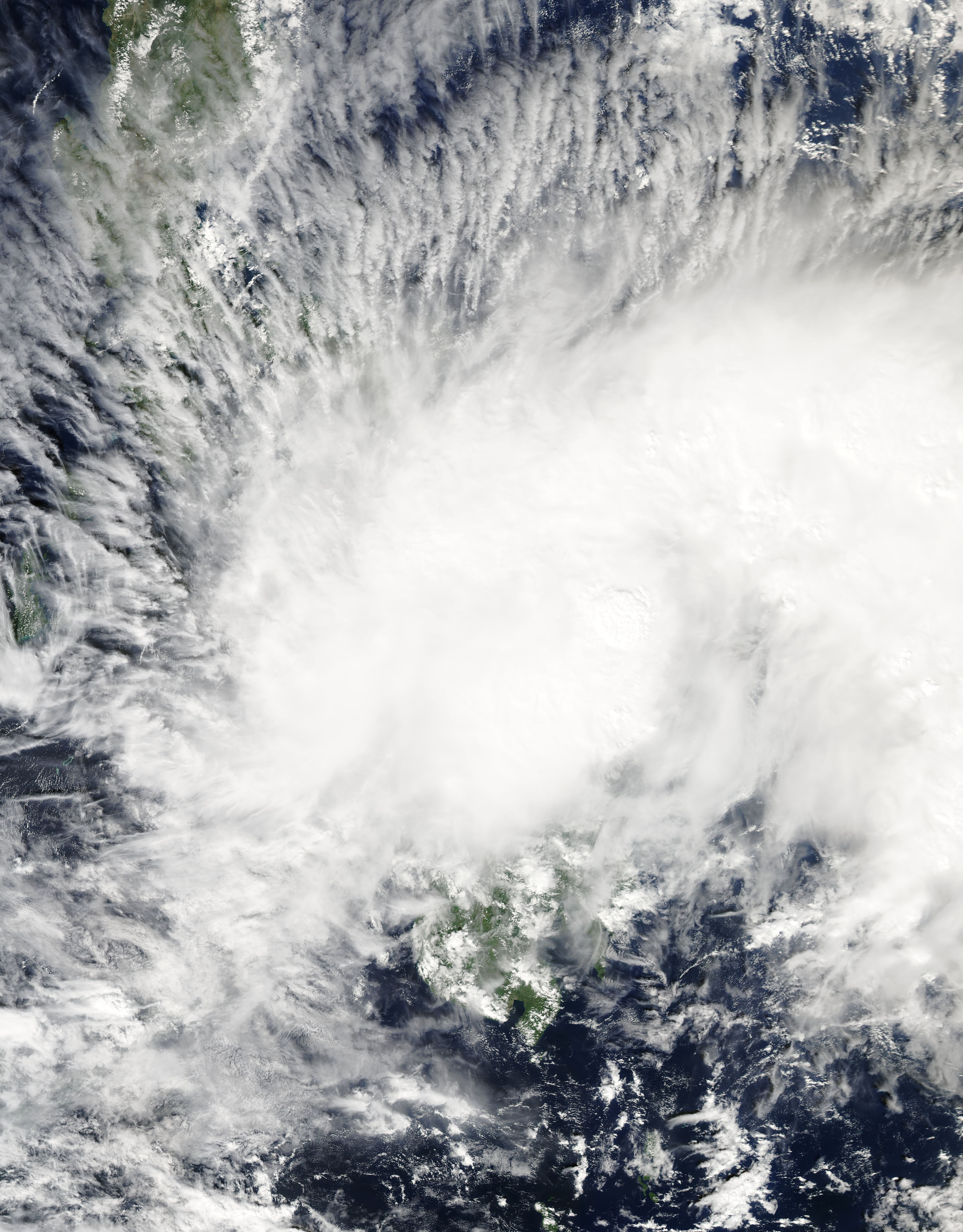
Tropical Depression 01W (Auring) hours before landfall on January 8.

January 8

- 00:00 UTC at 9.0°N 127.1°E — The JTWC starts tracking on Auring as a tropical depression, designating it 01W while it nears Mindanao.
- 06:00 UTC at 9.3°N 126.6°E — The JMA analyzes 01W (Auring)'s central pressure slightly fell to 1002 hPa as it was about to landfall.
- 07:00 UTC (15:00 PHT) at 9.9°N 126.1°E — Tropical Depression 01W (Auring) makes its first landfall on Siargao Island, Surigao del Norte.
- 08:00 UTC (16:00 PHT) at 10.1°N 125.6°E — Tropical Depression 01W (Auring) makes its second landfall on the province of Dinagat Islands.
- 10:00 UTC (18:00 PHT) at 10.1°N 125.2°E — Tropical Depression 01W (Auring) strikes the southern tip of Panaon Island, Southern Leyte for its third landfall.
- 12:00 UTC at 9.8°N 125.9°E — The JTWC analyzes 01W (Auring) to have attained its peak 1-minute sustained winds of 30 knots (56 km/h; 35 mph) as it traverses Bohol Sea.
- 18:00 UTC at 10.0°N 125.4°E — After attaining its strongest winds, the JTWC also assesses 01W (Auring)'s central pressure had dropped to 1000 hPa as it closes in on Bohol.
- 20:45 UTC (04:45 PHT, January 9) at 10.1°N 124.5°E — Tropical Depression 01W (Auring) makes its fourth and final landfall on Ubay, Bohol.

January 9

- 00:00 UTC (08:00 PHT) at 10.3°N 124.3°E — The PAGASA downgrades 01W (Auring) to a low-pressure area after making multiple landfalls in the archipelago.
- 06:00 UTC
  - At 10.1°N 124.2°E — After a brief increase in pressure, the JMA analyzes 01W's central pressure slightly fell to 1004 hPa.
  - At 10.3°N 124.0°E — The JTWC also assesses 01W has weakened to a tropical wave.
- 12:00 UTC at 10.0°N 123.1°E — The JMA downgrades 01W to a low-pressure area as it crosses Visayas.

January 11

- 06:00 UTC at 10°N 115°E — The JMA starts re-tracking the remnant low of Ex-01W as a tropical depression now located over the South China Sea.

January 12

- 06:00 UTC at 11°N 112°E — The JMA analyzes Ex-01W's central pressure had slightly dropped to 1004 hPa as it continues to move westwards.

January 13

- 06:00 UTC at 11°N 112°E — Tropical Depression Ex-01W's central pressure slightly drops again to 1004 hPa after pressure fluctuations.
- 18:00 UTC at 10.5°N 111.6°E — The JTWC reports the remnants of 01W has regained tropical depression status and subsequently peaked with 1-minute sustained winds of 25 knots (46 km/h; 29 mph) and a central pressure of 1004 hPa.

January 14

- 18:00 UTC at 9.4°N 110.0°E — The JTWC downgrades 01W again to a weather disturbance as it moves to the west-southwest.

January 16

- 00:00 UTC at 9°N 108°E — The JMA last notes Tropical Depression Ex-01W as it nears the coast of Vietnam; the depression dissipates six hours later.

=== February ===
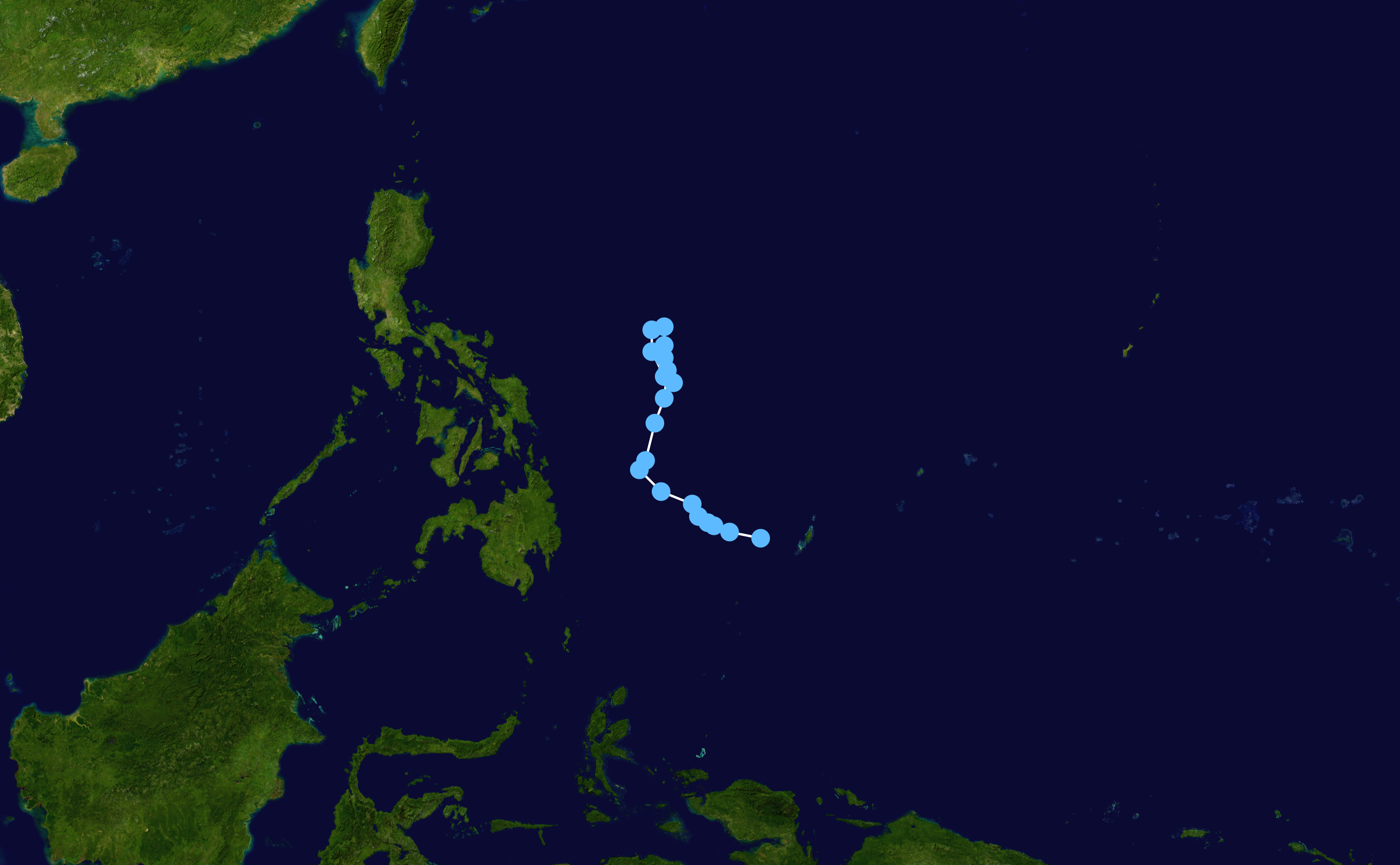
Track of Tropical Depression Bising during early February.

February 3

- 06:00 UTC
  - At 7.4°N 133.0°E — A tropical depression forms near Palau over the Philippine Sea. The JMA analyzes the system having 10-minute sustained winds of 30 knots (56 km/h; 35 mph) and a central pressure of 1002 hPa.
  - (14:00 PHT) at 7.9°N 133.3°E — The PAGASA names the tropical depression near Palau as Bising as it was within the PAR. The agency assesses the system having 10-minute sustained winds of 45 kilometres per hour (24 kn; 28 mph) and a central pressure of 1004 hPa.

February 4

- 06:00 UTC at 8.1°N 131.0°E — The JMA analyzes Tropical Depression Bising had attained a lower central pressure of 1000 hPa.
- 18:00 UTC at 8.9°N 129.8°E — Tropical Depression Bising re-attains its lowest central pressure of 1000 hPa.

February 5

- 06:00 UTC at 9.9°N 129.3°E — Tropical Depression Bising's central pressure briefly drops to 1002 hPa as it starts to move to the north-northeast.
- 18:00 UTC at 11.9°N 129.9°E — Tropical Depression Bising's central pressure fluctuates, slightly dropping back to 1002 hPa.

February 6

- 06:00 UTC
  - At 13.2°N 129.9°E — Tropical Depression Bising's central pressure briefly drops to 1002 hPa again as it continues its generally northward movement.
  - (14:00 PHT) at 13.1°N 130.2°E — Tropical Depression Bising weakens to a low-pressure area, according to the PAGASA as it was now located to the east of Bicol Region.
- 18:00 UTC at 14.2°N 129.9°E — Tropical Depression Ex-Bising's central pressure continues to fluctuate, dropping back to 1002 hPa as it starts to turn south.

February 7

- 06:00 UTC at 13.4°N 129.5°E — The JMA analyzes Ex-Bising's central pressure briefly drops to 1002 hPa again.
- 18:00 UTC at 12.4°N 130.2°E — As Ex-Bising meanders in the same area, its central pressure drops back to 1002 hPa for the final time. Six hours later, the JMA finally downgrades Ex-Bising to a low-pressure area east of Visayas.

=== March ===
March 19

- 00:00 UTC at 8.2°N 132.4°E — The JMA reports a tropical depression has formed west-northwest of Palau.
- 06:00 UTC at 8.8°N 131.1°E — The tropical depression west-northwest of Palau attains its lowest central pressure of 1008 hPa as it moves west-northwest.

March 20

- 18:00 UTC at 11.7°N 123.6°E — After crossing Leyte Island, the tropical depression formerly west-northwest of Palau re-attains its lowest central pressure of 1008 hPa over the Visayan Sea.

March 21

- 06:00 UTC at 12.6°N 123.0°E — The JMA last notes the tropical depression formerly over the Visayan Sea after having crossed Masbate Island and had now emerged over the Sibuyan Sea; the depression dissipates six hours later.

=== April ===
April 13

- 00:00 UTC at 7°N 134°E — A tropical depression forms nearly northeast of Palau with a central pressure of 1008 hPa.

April 14

- 06:00 UTC
  - At 10.2°N 130.0°E — The tropical depression now to the west-northwest of Palau attains 10-minute sustained winds of 30 knots (56 km/h; 35 mph) and a central pressure of 1006 hPa as it nears Visayas.
  - (14:00 PHT) at 10.1°N 130.5°E — The PAGASA names the tropical depression nearing Visayas as Crising, assessing the system having reached its lowest central pressure at 1004 hPa.

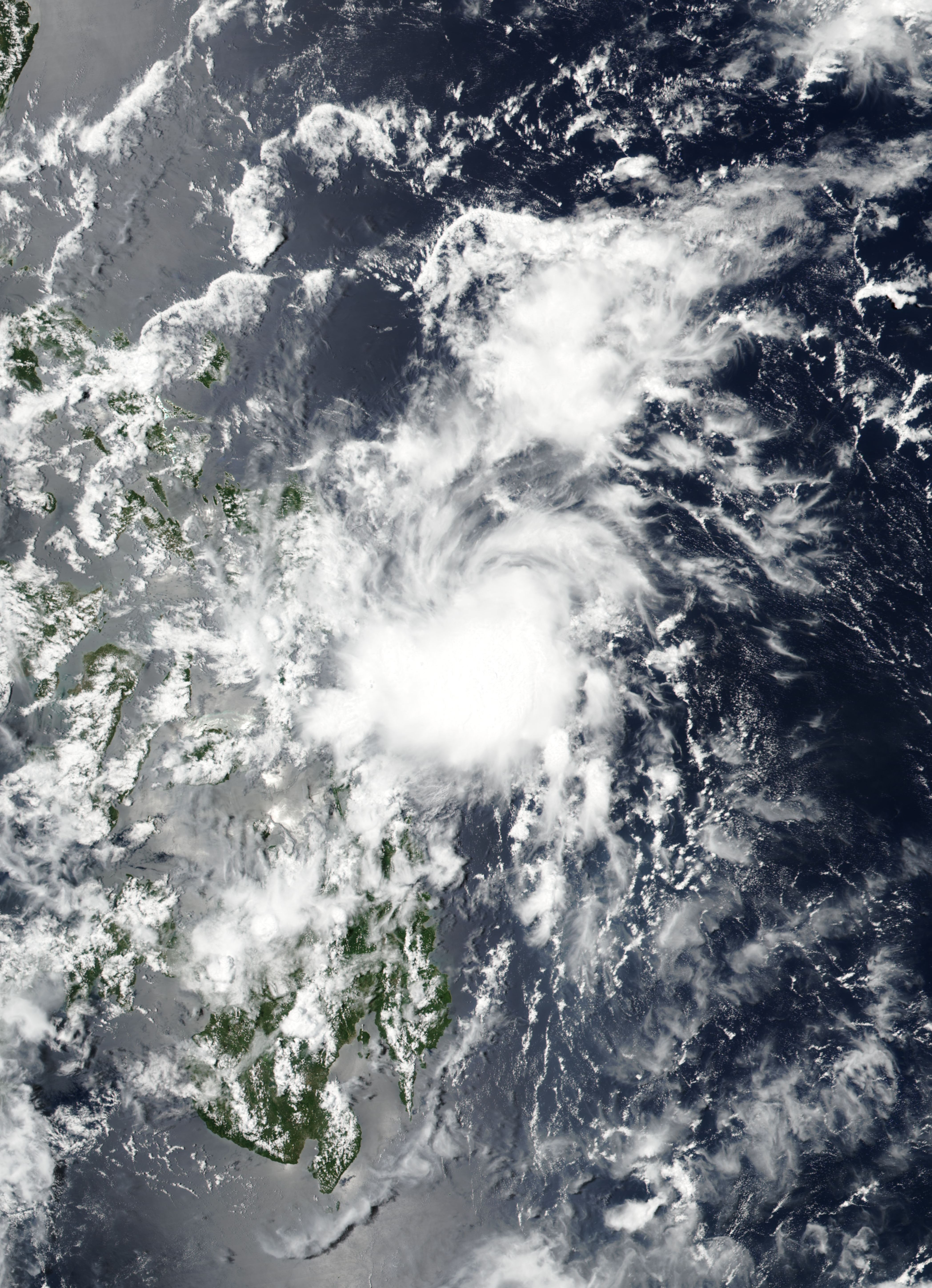
Tropical Depression Crising hours before landfall in the Philippines on April 15.

April 15

- 00:00 UTC (08:00 PHT) at 11.1°N 127.3°E — The PAGASA reports Tropical Depression Crising attains its peak 10-minute sustained winds of 55 kilometres per hour (30 kn; 34 mph) as it continues moving toward Samar Island.
- 06:00 UTC at 11.3°N 127.0°E — The JMA reports Crising re-attained its lowest central pressure of 1006 hPa.
- 10:30 UTC (18:30 PHT) at 11.3°N 125.6°E — Tropical Depression Crising strikes Hernani, Eastern Samar.
- 12:00 UTC (20:00 PHT) at 11.5°N 125.0°E — The PAGASA assesses Crising has weakened to a remnant low as it continues to cross Samar Island.

April 16

- 06:00 UTC at 11°N 122°E — After crossing Visayas and emerging off Panay Island, the JMA determines Ex-Crising re-attained a central pressure of 1008 hPa.
- 18:00 UTC at 13°N 118°E — Tropical Depression Ex-Crising's central pressure slightly drops to 1008 hPa after briefly fluctuating as the system moves over the South China Sea.

April 18

- 00:00 UTC at 15.3°N 116.9°E — The JTWC designates Ex-Crising as 02W as it moves north-northeast over the South China Sea. Subsequently, the agency determines the system peaked with 1-minute sustained winds of 25 knots (46 km/h; 29 mph) and a central pressure of 1004 hPa. (Note: Operationally, 02W was a tropical depression by the JTWC before its landfall in Samar, but in post-season analysis, the agency determined it to be a weather disturbance at the time. Similarly, the agency never re-upgraded the system to a tropical depression as it emerged over the South China Sea until the end of the season.)
- 06:00 UTC at 16°N 117°E — Tropical Depression 02W re-attains a central pressure of 1008 hPa for the fourth time, according to the JMA.

April 19

- 06:00 UTC at 18°N 118°E — 02W's central pressure fluctuates down to 1008 hPa for the final time as it turns to the northeast.
- 12:00 UTC at 19.1°N 118.8°E — The JTWC downgrades 02W to a weather disturbance as it enters Luzon Strait.

April 20

- 00:00 UTC at 21°N 121°E — The JMA last notes Ex-02W as it moves northeastward across the Luzon Strait; the system dissipates six hours later.

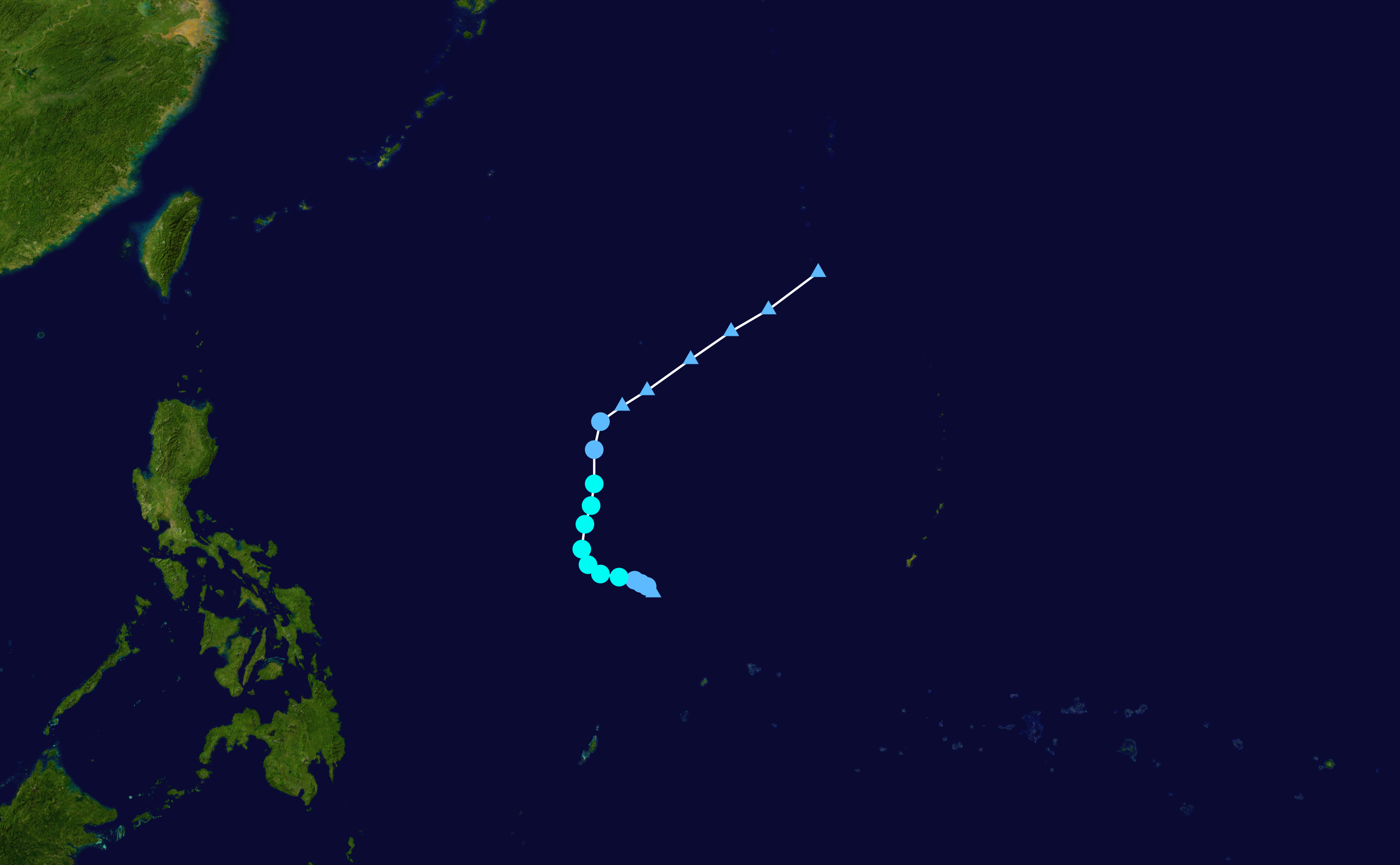
Track of Muifa during late April.

April 22

- 18:00 UTC at 8.6°N 143.9°E — The JMA determines the formation of a tropical depression south of Guam.

April 25

- 00:00 UTC at 12.6°N 136.3°E — The JTWC designates the tropical depression now west-southwest of Guam as 03W with its pressure dropping to 1004 hPa as it slows down while moving west-northwest.
- 18:00 UTC
  - At 13.1°N 136.0°E — The JMA upgrades 03W to a tropical storm, naming it Muifa, becoming the first named storm of the season. Subsequently, it peaked with 10-minute sustained winds of 35 knots (65 km/h; 40 mph) and a central pressure of 1002 hPa.
  - At 12.9°N 135.4°E — The JTWC follows suit and upgrades Muifa to a tropical storm as well.

April 26

- 00:00 UTC (08:00 PHT) at 13.4°N 135.0°E — The PAGASA reports Tropical Storm Muifa had entered the PAR and was named Dante while at its peak intensity of 10-minute sustained winds of 65 kilometres per hour (35 kn; 40 mph) and a central pressure of 998 hPa.
- 18:00 UTC at 14.6°N 134.4°E — The JTWC assesses Muifa (Dante) has attained its peak intensity with 1-minute sustained winds of 40 knots (74 km/h; 46 mph) and a central pressure of 993 hPa as it turns to the north-northeast.

April 27

- 06:00 UTC at 15.9°N 134.7°E — The JMA downgrades Muifa (Dante) back to a tropical depression.
- 12:00 UTC
  - At 17.0°N 134.6°E — The JTWC follows suit and downgrades Muifa (Dante) to a tropical depression as it picks up speed.
  - (20:00 PHT) at 16.4°N 134.8°E — The PAGASA follows suit and downgrades Muifa (Dante) to a tropical depression as it was about to leave the PAR.
- 14:00 UTC (22:00 PHT) at 16.9°N 135.1°E — The PAGASA reports Muifa (Dante) has left the PAR.

April 28

- 00:00 UTC at 18.4°N 135.5°E — The JTWC downgrades Muifa further to a weather disturbance as it moves northeast.

April 29

- 06:00 UTC at 22.7°N 141.8°E — The JMA last notes Muifa as it becomes embedded on a stationary front; the depression fully embeds six hours later.

=== May ===
- There is no tropical cyclone activity during May.

=== June ===
June 10

- 00:00 UTC at 13.0°N 119.0°E — The JMA marks a tropical depression over the South China Sea west of Mindoro.
- 18:00 UTC at 15.6°N 117.5°E — The JTWC tags the tropical depression west of Mindoro as Tropical Depression 04W.

June 11

- 00:00 UTC at 16.0°N 116.8°E — The JMA upgrades 04W to a tropical storm, naming it Merbok as it moves generally northwards.
- 06:00 UTC at 17.6°N 116.4°E — The JTWC reports Merbok has strengthened to a tropical storm with its pressure slightly dropping to 996 hPa on their analysis.

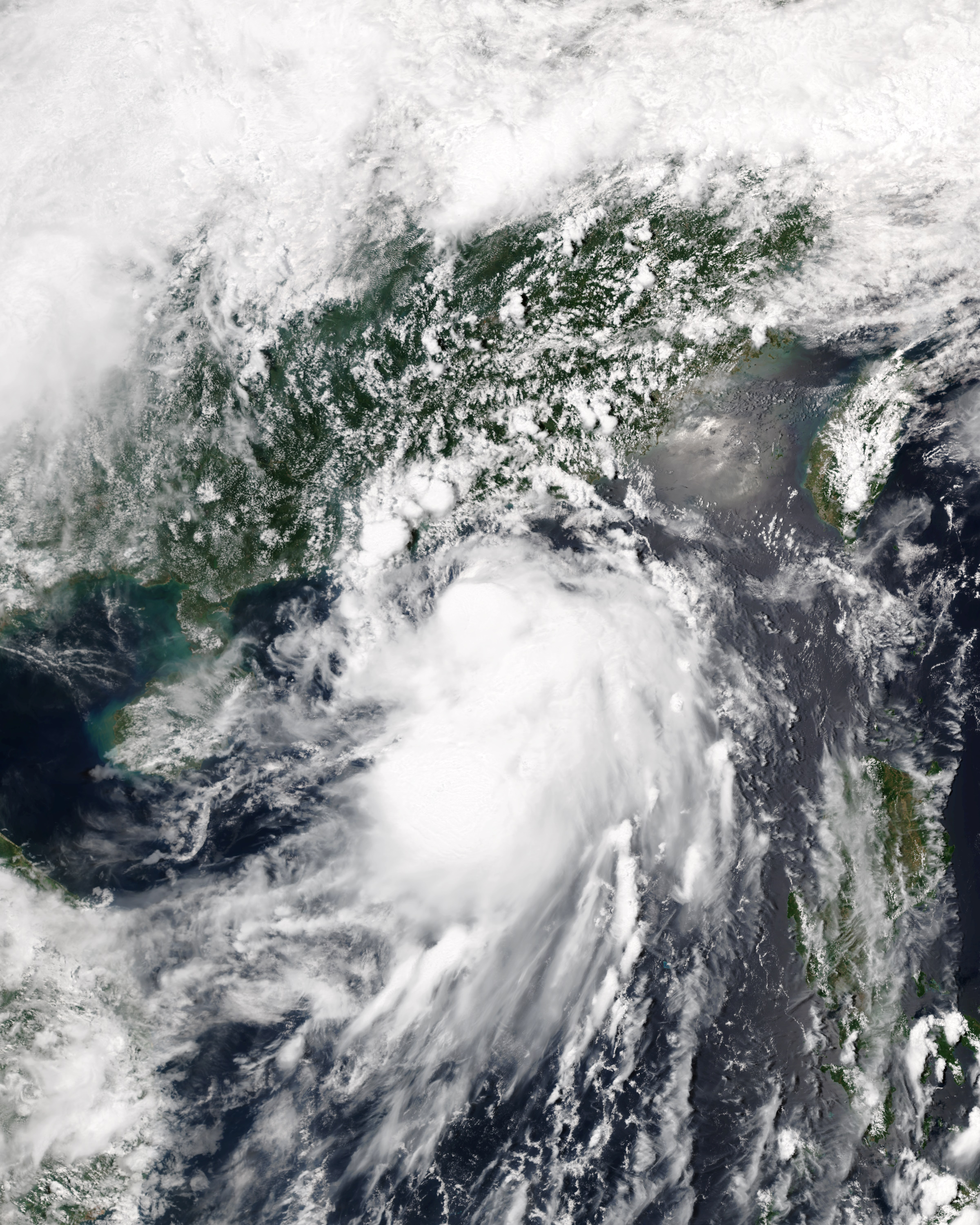
Merbok approaching China on June 12.

June 12

- 00:00 UTC at 20.2°N 115.0°E — The JTWC reports Tropical Storm Merbok has peaked with 1-minute sustained winds of 45 knots (83 km/h; 52 mph) and a central pressure of 989 hPa as it nears South China.
- 06:00 UTC at 21.2°N 114.5°E — The JMA further upgrades Merbok to a severe tropical storm as it moves closer to land.
- 12:00 UTC at 22.0°N 114.4°E — The JMA reports Severe Tropical Storm Merbok has peaked with 10-minute sustained winds of 55 knots (102 km/h; 63 mph) and a central pressure of 985 hPa as it was about to make landfall.
- 15:00 UTC (23:00 CST) at 22.5°N 114.5°E — Merbok makes landfall on Dapeng Peninsula, Shenzhen, Guangdong.
- 18:00 UTC at 22.9°N 114.6°E — The JMA downgrades Merbok to a tropical storm as it moves further inland.

June 13

- 00:00 UTC
  - At 24.0°N 115.0°E — The JMA reports Merbok has weakened further to a tropical depression.
  - At 23.8°N 114.9°E — The JTWC last notes Merbok as it weakens to a tropical depression.
- 06:00 UTC at 25.5°N 115.7°E — The JMA last notes Tropical Depression Merbok as it embeds itself on a stationary front over China; the system fully embeds six hours later.

June 28

- 00:00 UTC at 20.7°N 133.0°E — A tropical depression forms over the Philippine Sea southwest of Okinawa Island.

June 30

- 18:00 UTC at 30.5°N 130.7°E — After the tropical depression passes west of Okinawa and recurves to the northeast, it attains its lowest pressure of 1008 hPa as it parallels the southern coastline of Japan.

=== July ===
July 1

- 00:00 UTC at 31.5°N 133.0°E — The tropical depression south of Japan weakens to a low-pressure area.
- 06:00 UTC
  - At 32.1°N 135.1°E — The remnants of a tropical depression south of Japan regain tropical depression status with a central pressure of 1010 hPa.
  - At 15.0°N 132.2°E — Another tropical depression forms in the Philippine Sea.
- 12:00 UTC at 32.4°N 137.7°E — The JMA last notes the tropical depression south of Japan as it moves eastward away from the coastline; it dissipates six hours later.
- 18:00 UTC
  - At 19.4°N 128.2°E — As the tropical depression moves northwest at a quick pace, the JTWC designated the system as 05W.
  - (02:00 PHT, July 2) at 18.1°N 129.2°E — The PAGASA names 05W as Tropical Depression Emong.

July 2

- 00:00 UTC
  - At 20.7°N 127.1°E — The JMA upgrades 05W (Emong) to a tropical storm, naming it Nanmadol as it continues to move northwestward.
  - At 20.7°N 126.9°E — The JTWC follows in upgrading Nanmadol (Emong) to a tropical storm at a low central pressure of 996 hPa.
- 03:00 UTC (11:00 PHT) at 21.2°N 126.1°E — The PAGASA reports Nanmadol (Emong) has strengthened to a tropical storm.
- 18:00 UTC
  - At 24.7°N 124.1°E — The JMA reports Nanmadol (Emong) has further intensified to a severe tropical storm after passing very close to Ishigaki Island.
  - (02:00 PHT, July 3) at 24.8°N 124.0°E — The PAGASA reports Nanmadol (Emong) has intensified to a severe tropical storm as it was about to leave the PAR, reaching its peak with 10-minute sustained winds of 95 kilometres per hour (51 kn; 59 mph) and a central pressure of 987 hPa.
- 20:00 UTC (04:00 PHT, July 3) at 25.2°N 124.0°E — Severe Tropical Storm Nanmadol (Emong) leaves the PAR, as reported by PAGASA.

July 3

- 06:00 UTC at 27.7°N 125.0°E — The JMA reports Nanmadol has reached its peak intensity with 10-minute sustained winds of 55 knots (102 km/h; 63 mph) and a central pressure of 985 hPa as it began moving northeast.
- 09:00 UTC at 28.7°N 125.6°E — The JTWC upgrades Nanmadol to a Category 1 typhoon, subsequently peaking at 1-minute sustained winds of 65 knots (120 km/h; 75 mph) and a lower central pressure of 974 hPa.
- 12:00 UTC at 29.6°N 126.1°E — The JTWC downgrades Nanmadol to a tropical storm not long after its peak.
- 23:00 UTC (08:00 JST, July 4) at 32.7°N 130.0°E — Severe Tropical Storm Nanmadol makes its first landfall on Nagasaki City, Nagasaki Prefecture at Kyushu.

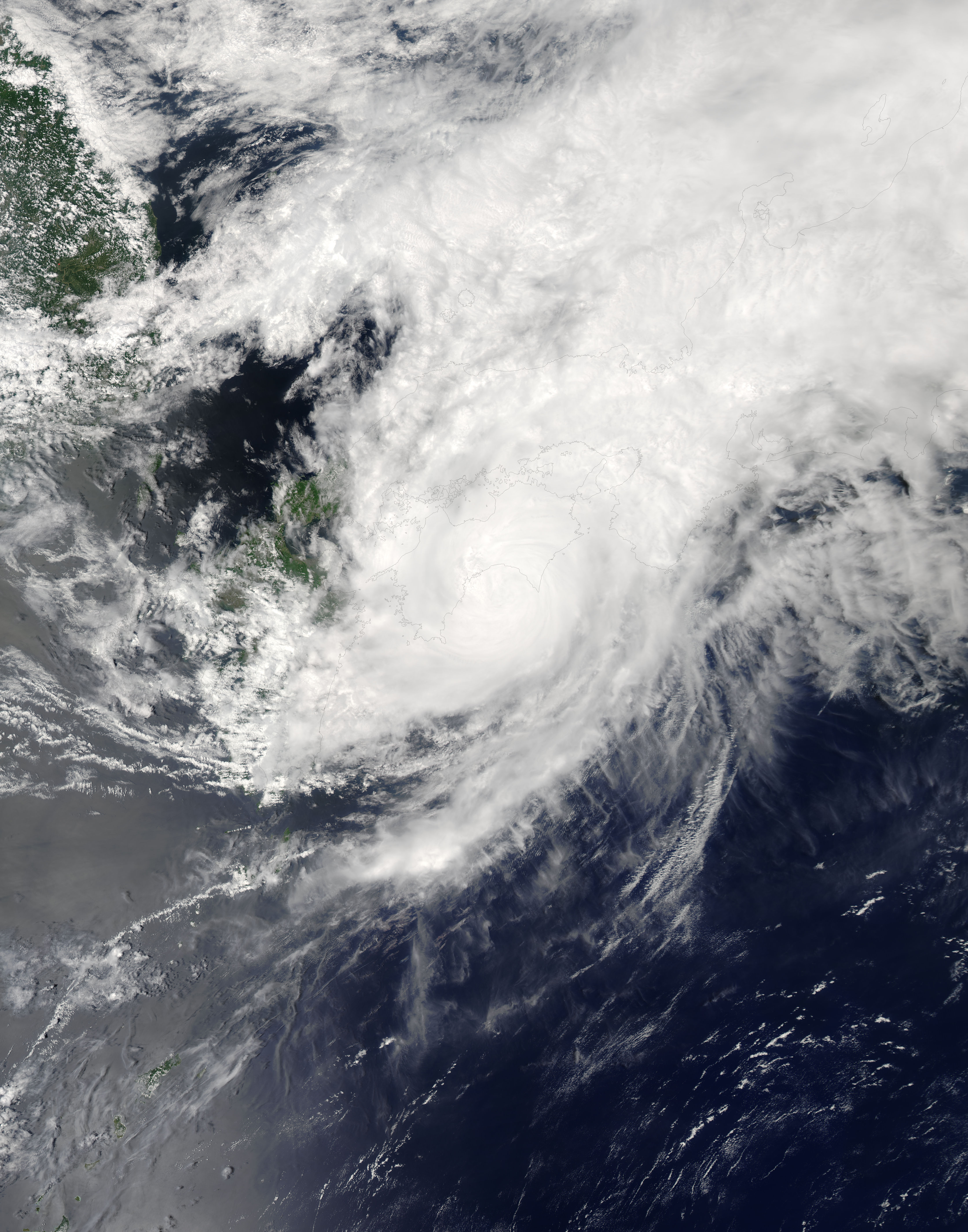
Nanmadol moving across southern Japan on July 4.

July 4

- 00:00 UTC
  - At 15.8°N 134.4°E — Another tropical depression forms over the Philippine Sea.
  - At 32.8°N 130.4°E — While still traversing Kyushu, the JTWC reports a brief pressure drop at Nanmadol to 985 hPa.
- 03:00 UTC (12:00 JST) at 33.2°N 132.3°E — After briefly emerging over the Seto Inland Sea, Nanmadol makes its second landfall on Uwajima City, Ehime Prefecture at Shikoku.
- 06:00 UTC at 17.3°N 132.9°E — While moving northwest over the Philippine Sea, the tropical depression's central pressure drops slightly to 1010 hPa.
- 08:00 UTC (17:00 JST) at 33.7°N 135.4°E — Emerging off the coast of Shikoku, Nanmadol proceeds to cross the Kii Channel and make its third landfall on Tanabe City, Wakayama Prefecture at southern Honshu.

July 5

- 00:00 UTC at 36.1°N 146.0°E — Now moving away from Japan, Nanmadol turns extratropical over the Pacific Ocean.
- 06:00 UTC at 36.9°N 150.1°E — The JTWC last notes Nanmadol as it turns extratropical based on their analysis.

July 6

- 06:00 UTC at 24.6°N 124.4°E — The JMA analyzes the tropical depression formerly over the Philippine Sea of having 10-minute sustained winds of 30 knots (56 km/h; 35 mph) with its central pressure dropping back to 1010 hPa as it enters the East China Sea after moving near Ishigaki Island.

July 7

- 00:00 UTC at 30.7°N 125.3°E — The JMA last notes the tropical depression over the East China Sea as it was getting absorbed by a stationary front stemming from the extratropical remnants of Nanmadol; it was fully absorbed six hours later.

July 8

- 12:00 UTC at 53.1°N 177.7°W — The JMA last notes the extratropical remnants of Nanmadol as it had crossed the International Date Line (IDL).

July 11

- 00:00 UTC at 24.4°N 139.8°E — The JMA marks a tropical depression near the Ogasawara Islands.

July 12

- 18:00 UTC at 24.7°N 141.1°E — The tropical depression near the Ogasawara Islands attains its lowest central pressure of 1006 hPa as it struggles with a weak steering environment.

July 13

- 06:00 UTC at 25.9°N 141.8°E — The JMA assesses the tropical depression near the Ogasawara Islands of having 10-minute sustained winds of 30 knots (56 km/h; 35 mph).

July 14

- 00:00 UTC at 16.0°N 114.1°E — A tropical depression forms over the South China Sea.

July 15

- 00:00 UTC at 16.9°N 112.3°E — The JTWC designates the tropical depression over the South China Sea as 06W as it moves to the west-northwest.
- 06:00 UTC
  - At 16.9°N 111.7°E — Tropical Depression 06W intensifies to a tropical storm, gaining the name Talas.
  - At 33.2°N 145.0°E — The JMA last notes the tropical depression formerly near the Ogasawara Islands as it moves northeast, dissipating six hours later.
- 18:00 UTC at 17.6°N 110.1°E — The JTWC upgrades Talas to a tropical storm as it moves south of Hainan.

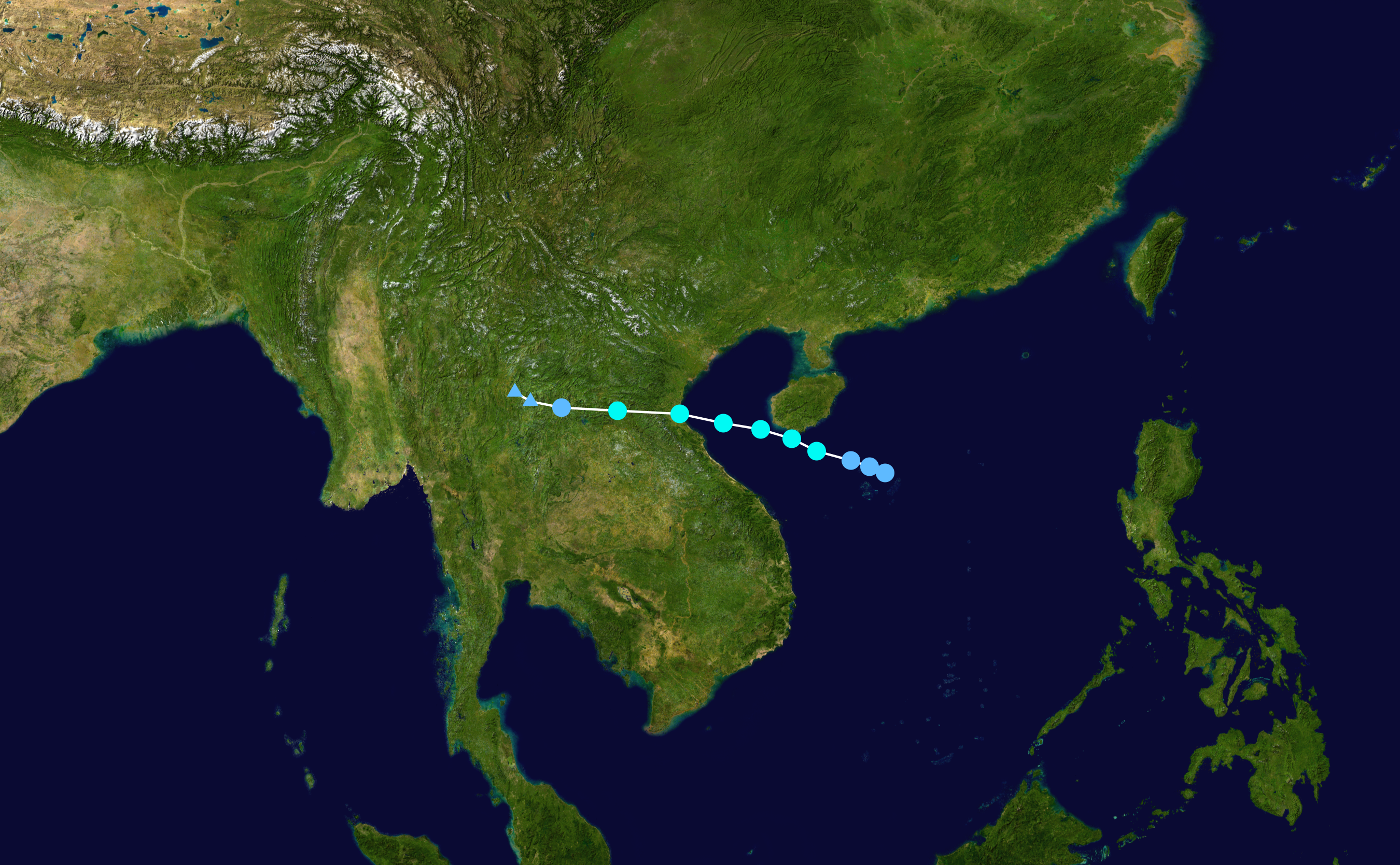
Track of Talas during mid-July.

July 16

- 00:00 UTC at 36.2°N 148.3°E — The JMA reports the remnants of a tropical depression formerly near the Ogasawara Islands briefly re-formed as it attains a central pressure of 1012 hPa before dissipating again six hours later.
- 06:00 UTC
  - At 18.0°N 108.5°E — The JMA upgrades Talas to a severe tropical storm, attaining its maximum 10-minute winds of 50 knots (93 km/h; 58 mph) as it enters the Gulf of Tonkin.
  - At 18.3°N 108.3°E — The JTWC reports Talas has reached its peak with 1-minute sustained winds of 50 knots (93 km/h; 58 mph) and a central pressure of 985 hPa as it approaches Vietnam.
- 18:00 UTC (01:00 ICT, July 17) at 18.5°N 105.6°E — Severe Tropical Storm Talas makes landfall on Central Vietnam at its lowest central pressure of 985 hPa per the JMA.

July 17

- 00:00 UTC at 18.9°N 104.0°E — The JMA downgrades Talas to a tropical storm after it had crossed to Laos.
- 06:00 UTC at 19.0°N 101.9°E — The JTWC downgrades Talas to a tropical depression as it is about to cross over Thailand.
- 12:00 UTC
  - At 19.2°N 100.9°E — The JMA further downgrades Talas to a tropical depression.
  - At 19.5°N 100.2°E — The JTWC last notes Talas as it had weakened to a weather disturbance.
- 18:00 UTC at 19.5°N 100.4°E — The JMA last notes Talas as it further weakens; the system dissipates six hours later.

July 19

- 06:00 UTC at 26.1°N 162.1°E — The JMA marks a tropical depression over the Pacific Ocean north-northwest of Wake Island.

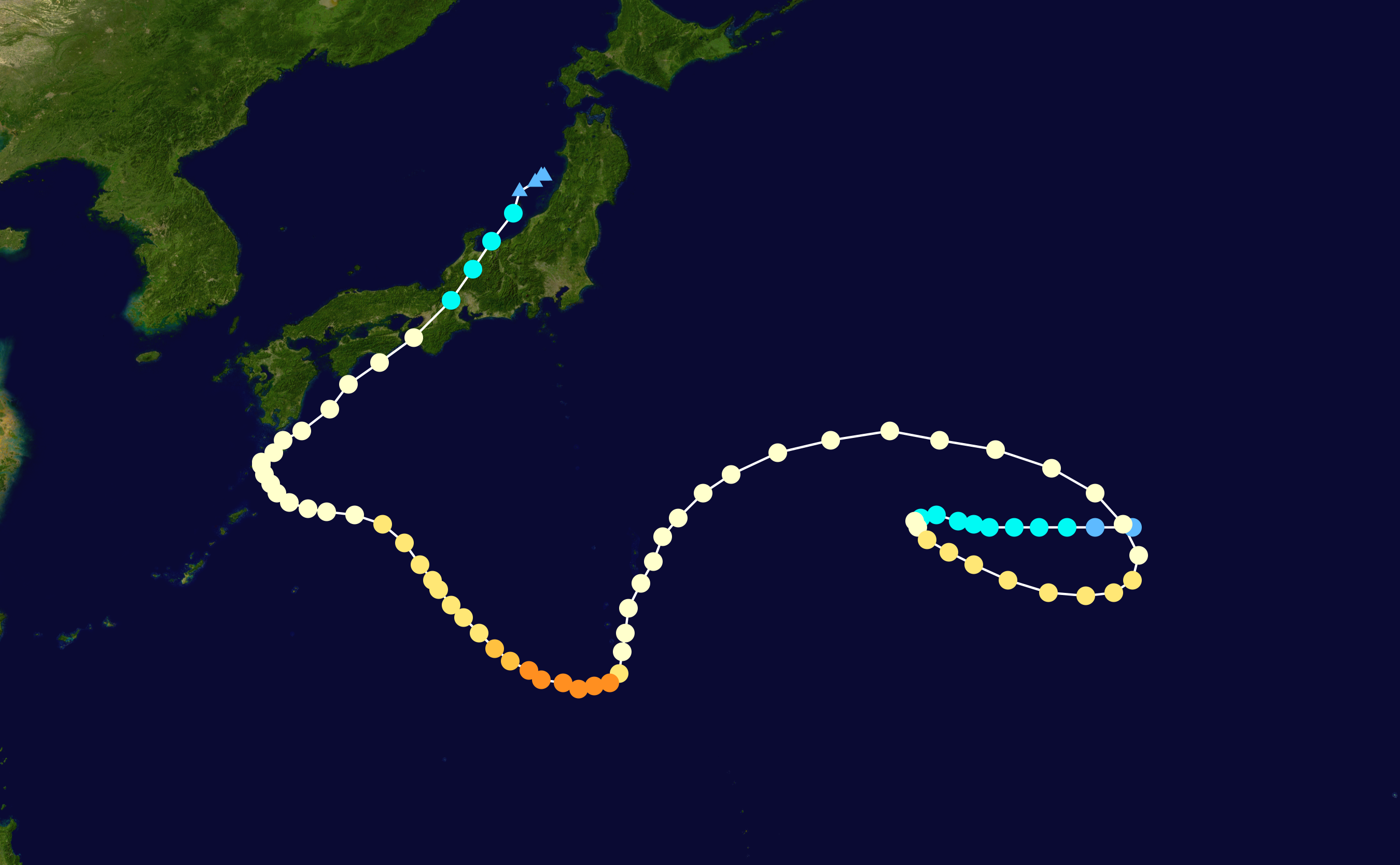
Track of Noru during late July to early August.

July 20

- 00:00 UTC at 23.0°N 178.1°E — Another tropical depression forms near the IDL southwest of Midway Atoll.
- 12:00 UTC at 27.4°N 159.0°E — The tropical depression to the north-northwest of Wake Island becomes a named tropical storm, Noru as it moves west-northwest.
- 18:00 UTC
  - At 27.9°N 158.2°E — The JTWC starts tracking on Noru as a tropical depression.
  - At 16.9°N 115.3°E — The JTWC reports Tropical Depression 08W has formed over the South China Sea.
  - At 24.9°N 177.1°E — The JTWC designates the tropical depression near the IDL as 09W.

July 21

- 00:00 UTC at 17.5°N 114.7°E — The JMA starts tracking on 08W as it gradually decelerates to the west-northwest.
- 06:00 UTC
  - At 26.4°N 177.3°E —The JMA upgrades 09W to a tropical storm, naming it Kulap.
  - At 18.6°N 124.3°E — A tropical depression forms northeast of Luzon.
  - At 26.7°N 177.1°E —The JTWC follows suit and upgrades Kulap to a tropical storm as it moves northward.
  - At 27.9°N 156.1°E — The JTWC upgrades Noru to a tropical storm as it continues its westward movement.
  - At 17.5°N 114.3°E — The JTWC reports 08W's central pressure had slightly dropped to 1000 hPa.
- 18:00 UTC
  - At 30.3°N 175.1°E —The JMA analyzes Kulap has attained its peak 10-minute winds of 40 kn (74 km/h; 46 mph) as it turns to the west.
  - At 19.7°N 122.0°E — The JTWC designates the tropical depression northeast of Luzon as 10W.
  - At 17.7°N 113.1°E — After a brief rise in pressure, 08W re-attains again a central pressure of 1000 hPa.
  - (02:00 PHT, July 22) at 19.6°N 122.8°E — The PAGASA names 10W as Tropical Depression Fabian as it approaches the Batanes Islands.
- 21:00 UTC (05:00 PHT, July 22) at 20.3°N 121.3°E — The PAGASA assesses 10W (Fabian) attains its maximum 10-minute sustained winds of 55 km/h (30 kn; 34 mph) as it crosses the Balintang Channel.

July 22

- 00:00 UTC
  - At 30.5°N 172.2°E —The JTWC assesses Kulap has peaked with 1-minute sustained winds of 50 kn (93 km/h; 58 mph) and a central pressure of 985 hPa.
  - (08:00 PHT) at 20.4°N 121.0°E — The PAGASA analyzes 10W (Fabian) has attained its lowest pressure of 1002 hPa.
- 06:00 UTC
  - At 21.2°N 119.0°E — The JMA upgrades 10W (Fabian) to a tropical storm, naming it Roke, subsequently attaining its highest 10-minute winds of 35 kn (65 km/h; 40 mph).
  - At 21.1°N 119.0°E — The JTWC upgrades Roke to a tropical storm as well, peaking with 1-minute sustained winds of 35 kn (65 km/h; 40 mph) and a central pressure of 996 hPa.
  - (14:00 PHT) at 21.2°N 119.2°E — The PAGASA reports Tropical Depression Roke (Fabian) has left the PAR.
- 12:00 UTC at 21.6°N 117.9°E — The JMA analyzes Roke's central pressure is at its lowest at 1002 hPa while the system approaches Southern China.
- 18:00 UTC at 28.6°N 151.9°E — The JMA upgrades Noru to a severe tropical storm as it turns southward, located to the northwest of Minamitorishima Island.

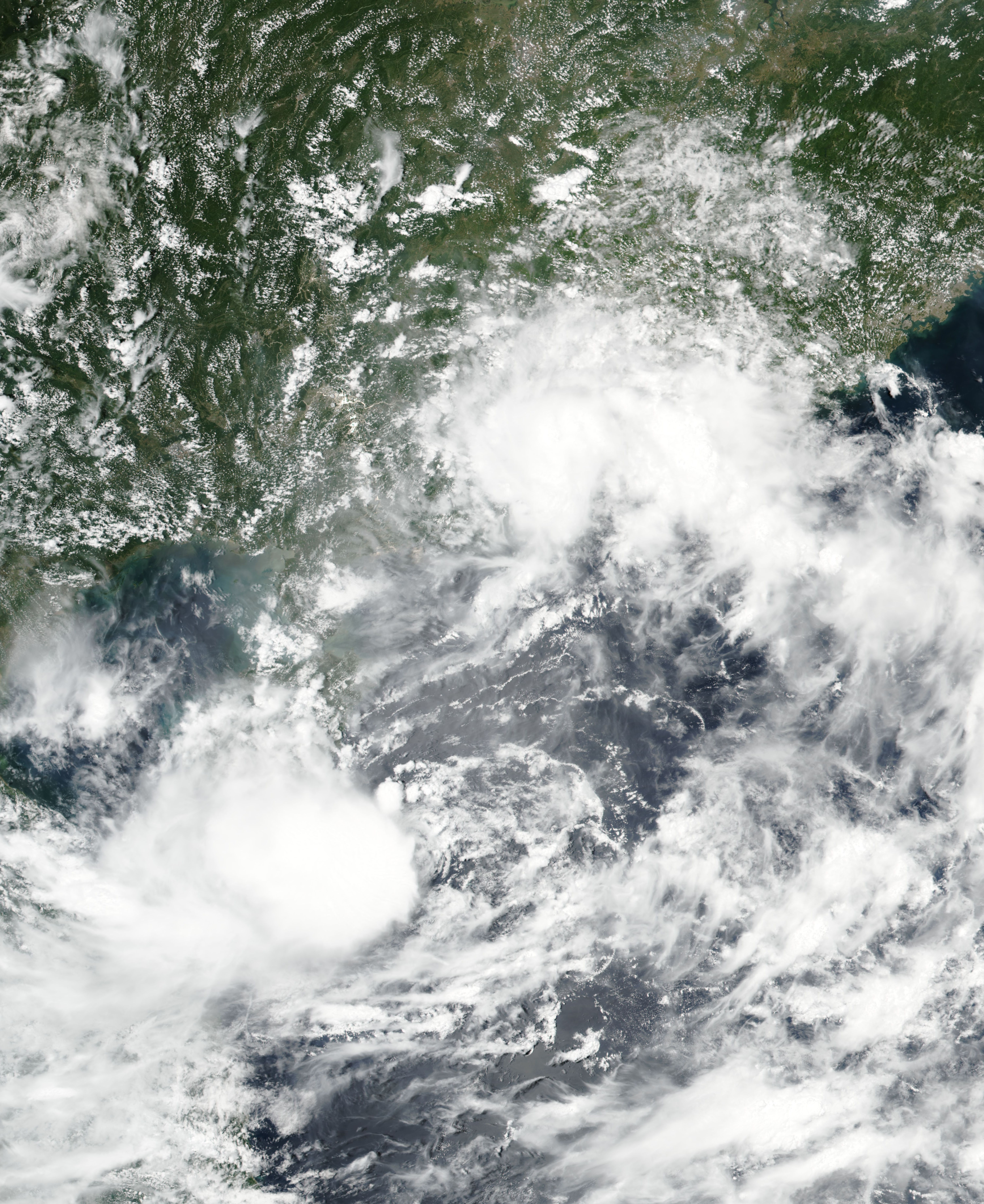
Two tropical cyclones near and over China: Roke (north) lashing southern China and Sonca (south) meandering over the South China Sea on July 23.

July 23

- 00:00 UTC
  - At 17.6°N 111.6°E — The JMA upgrades 08W to Tropical Storm Sonca as it slowly turns to the south, subsequently attaining its highest 10-minute winds of 35 kn (65 km/h; 40 mph). Similarly, the JTWC also upgrades the system to a tropical storm.
  - At 22.3°N 114.8°E — The JTWC downgrades Roke to a tropical depression as it is about to make landfall near Hong Kong.
- 01:40 UTC (09:40 HKT) at 22.4°N 114.3°E — Roke makes landfall on Sai Kung Town.
- 06:00 UTC
  - At 30.8°N 166.5°E — The JMA analyzes Kulap has attained its lowest pressure of 1002 hPa while maintaining its maximum winds.
  - At 22.8°N 113.2°E — The JMA downgrades Roke to a tropical depression after crossing the Pearl River.
  - At 28.1°N 151.2°E — Noru becomes a Category 1 typhoon from the JTWC as it makes a u-turn towards the southeast.
  - At 22.8°N 113.7°E — The JTWC last notes Roke as it weakens to a tropical disturbance.
- 12:00 UTC
  - At 28.0°N 151.4°E — The JMA further upgrades Noru to a typhoon as it moves slowly.
  - At 22.9°N 110.5°E — The JMA last notes Tropical Depression Roke as it dissipates over Guangdong; the system fully dissipates six hours later.
- 18:00 UTC at 27.5°N 151.6°E — The JTWC upgrades Noru to a Category 2 typhoon as it gradually accelerates.

July 24

- 00:00 UTC
  - At 27.2°N 152.2°E — The JMA analyzes Typhoon Noru has attained an initial peak of 10-minute sustained winds of 70 knots (130 km/h; 81 mph) and a central pressure of 970 hPa.
  - At 27.1°N 152.3°E — Likewise, the JTWC assesses Noru has peaked initially with 1-minute sustained winds of 90 knots (170 km/h; 100 mph) and a central pressure of 956 hPa.
  - At 32.1°N 162.8°E — The JTWC assesses Kulap has attained a secondary peak with 1-minute sustained winds of 45 knots (83 km/h; 52 mph) and a central pressure of 989 hPa as it was starting to interact with Kulap.
- 12:00 UTC at 16.9°N 110.1°E — The JTWC analyzes Sonca has peaked with 1-minute sustained winds of 45 knots (83 km/h; 52 mph) and a central pressure of 989 hPa as it passes to the south of Hainan.
- 18:00 UTC at 16.9°N 109.5°E — The JMA assesses Sonca's central pressure dropped to 994 hPa as the system gradually accelerates westward.

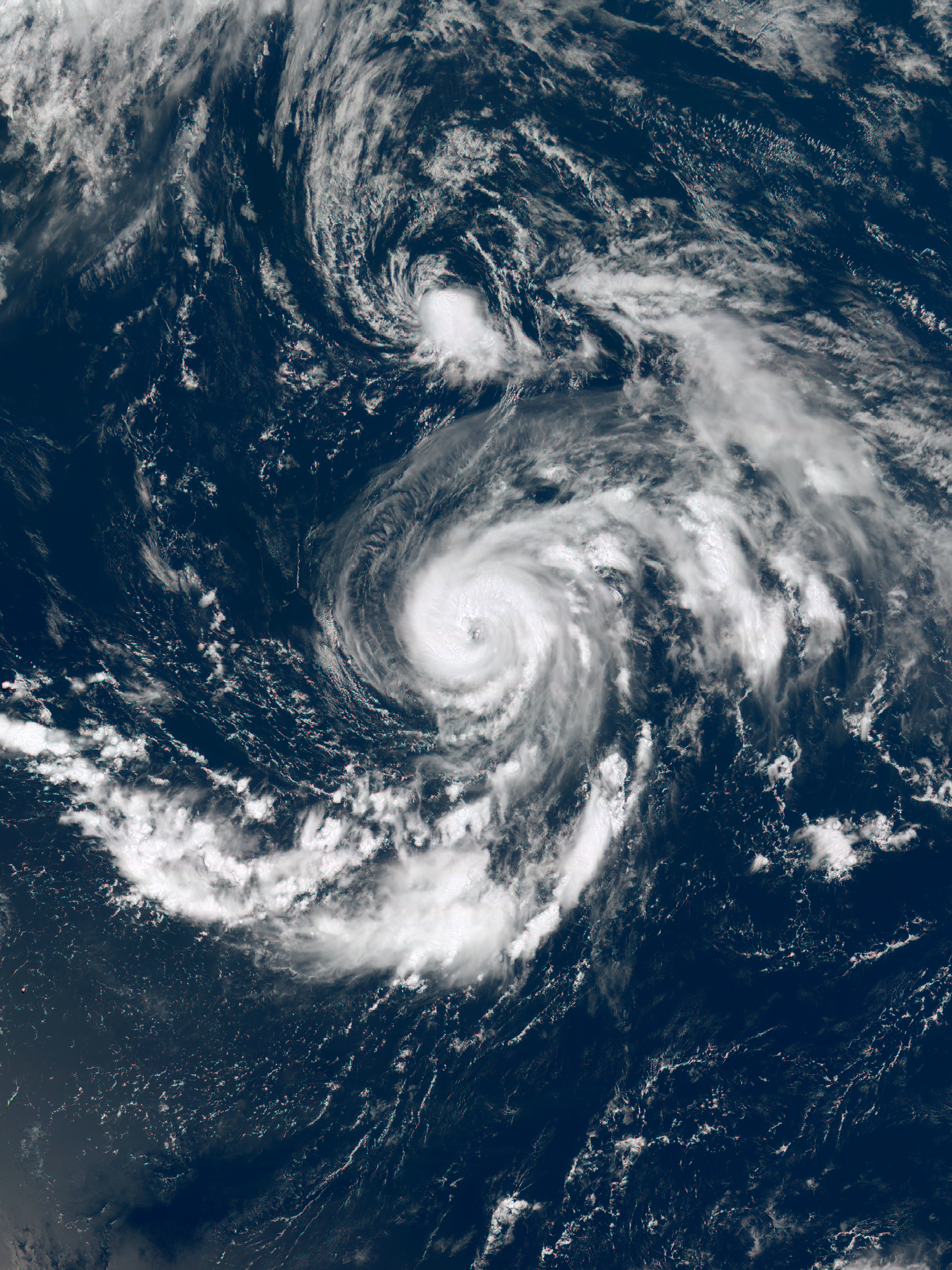
Two tropical cyclones undergoing a Fujiwhara effect with the stronger Noru (south) starting to absorb the weaker Kulap (north) on July 25.

July 25

- 06:00 UTC
  - At 12.8°N 129.2°E — A tropical depression forms over the Philippine Sea east of Bicol Region.
  - (14:00 PHT) at 13.2°N 129.2°E — The PAGASA names the tropical depression over the Philippine Sea as Gorio.
- 08:00 UTC (15:00 ICT) at 16.8°N 107.0°E — Sonca makes landfall on Quảng Trị province.
- 12:00 UTC
  - At 16.8°N 106.5°E — The JMA downgrades Sonca to a tropical depression after making landfall and emerging over Laos.
  - At 26.2°N 158.2°E — The JTWC assesses Typhoon Noru's central pressure briefly drops to 959 hPa as the typhoon turns north.
  - At 32.2°N 153.7°E — The JTWC downgrades Kulap to a tropical depression as it turns to the west-southwest.
- 18:00 UTC
  - At 32.0°N 152.3°E — The JMA follows suit in downgrading Kulap to a tropical depression as it becomes entangled with the stronger Typhoon Noru.
  - At 14.5°N 128.3°E — The JMA upgrades Gorio to a tropical storm, naming it Nesat as it moves northward.
  - At 15.1°N 128.3°E — The JTWC starts tracking on Nesat as a tropical storm.
  - At 27.0°N 158.4°E — The JTWC downgrades Noru to a Category 1 typhoon as it continues to interact with Kulap, turning northwestward, thus completing a counter-clockwise loop over the Pacific Ocean.
- 18:00 UTC at 23.9°N 171.2°E — A tropical depression forms near the IDL northeast of Wake Island.

July 26

- 00:00 UTC
  - At 16.4°N 104.1°E — The JTWC last notes Sonca as it weakens to a tropical depression while over Thailand.
  - (08:00 PHT) at 15.5°N 127.5°E — The PAGASA upgrades Nesat (Gorio) to a tropical storm as it was now to the east of Central Luzon.
- 06:00 UTC at 31.2°N 149.9°E — The JMA analyzes Kulap's central pressure slightly drops to 1002 hPa as it turns to the southwest.
- 18:00 UTC
  - At 24.0°N 173.4°E — The tropical depression near the IDL attains 10-minute sustained winds of 30 kn (56 km/h; 35 mph) and a central pressure of 1006 hPa as it slows down.
  - At 17.3°N 127.7°E — The JTWC analyzes Nesat (Gorio)'s central pressure has dropped to 985 hPa before rising again as the system turns to the north-northwest.
  - At 29.1°N 147.8°E — The JTWC assesses Kulap has weakened to a tropical disturbance as it was getting absorbed into Noru's circulation.

July 27

- 00:00 UTC at 17.5°N 127.6°E — The JMA further upgrades Nesat (Gorio) to a severe tropical storm as it slowly accelerates.
- 06:00 UTC (14:00 PHT) at 17.8°N 127.4°E — The PAGASA follows suit and upgrades Nesat (Gorio) to a severe tropical storm.
- 12:00 UTC at 19.2°N 117.8°E — A tropical depression forms over the South China Sea west of Luzon.
- 18:00 UTC at 30.3°N 146.8°E — Typhoon Noru's central pressure slightly drops to 970 hPa as it absorbs the remnants of Kulap.

July 28

- 00:00 UTC
  - At 29.6°N 145.2°E — The JMA downgrades Noru to a severe tropical storm as it turns to the southwest.
  - At 27.1°N 149.2°E — The JMA last notes Kulap as it loops to the north due to its interaction with Noru; the system was fully absorbed six hours later.
- 06:00 UTC
  - At 20.6°N 125.2°E — The JMA reports Nesat (Gorio) has further strengthened to a typhoon as it turns to the northwest.
  - At 20.7°N 125.2°E — The JTWC assesses Nesat (Gorio) has intensified to a Category 1 typhoon.
  - At 19.2°N 116.2°E — The JTWC designates the tropical depression over the South China Sea as 12W as it turns to the southwest.
  - (14:00 PHT) at 20.4°N 125.2°E — The PAGASA follows suit and upgrades Nesat (Gorio) to a typhoon.
- 18:00 UTC
  - At 18.0°N 115.8°E — The JMA upgrades 12W to a tropical storm, designating it Haitang.
  - At 21.7°N 123.5°E — The JMA reports Nesat (Gorio) has attained its peak intensity with 10-minute sustained winds of 80 knots (150 km/h; 92 mph) and a central pressure of 960 hPa as it turns north-northwestward.
  - At 18.2°N 116.0°E — The JTWC upgrades Haitang to a tropical storm as it turns to the east-northeast.
  - (02:00 PHT, July 29) at 21.7°N 123.6°E — The PAGASA reports Nesat (Gorio) has peaked with 10-minute sustained winds of 145 kilometres per hour (78 kn; 90 mph) and a central pressure of 957 hPa as it moves towards Taiwan.

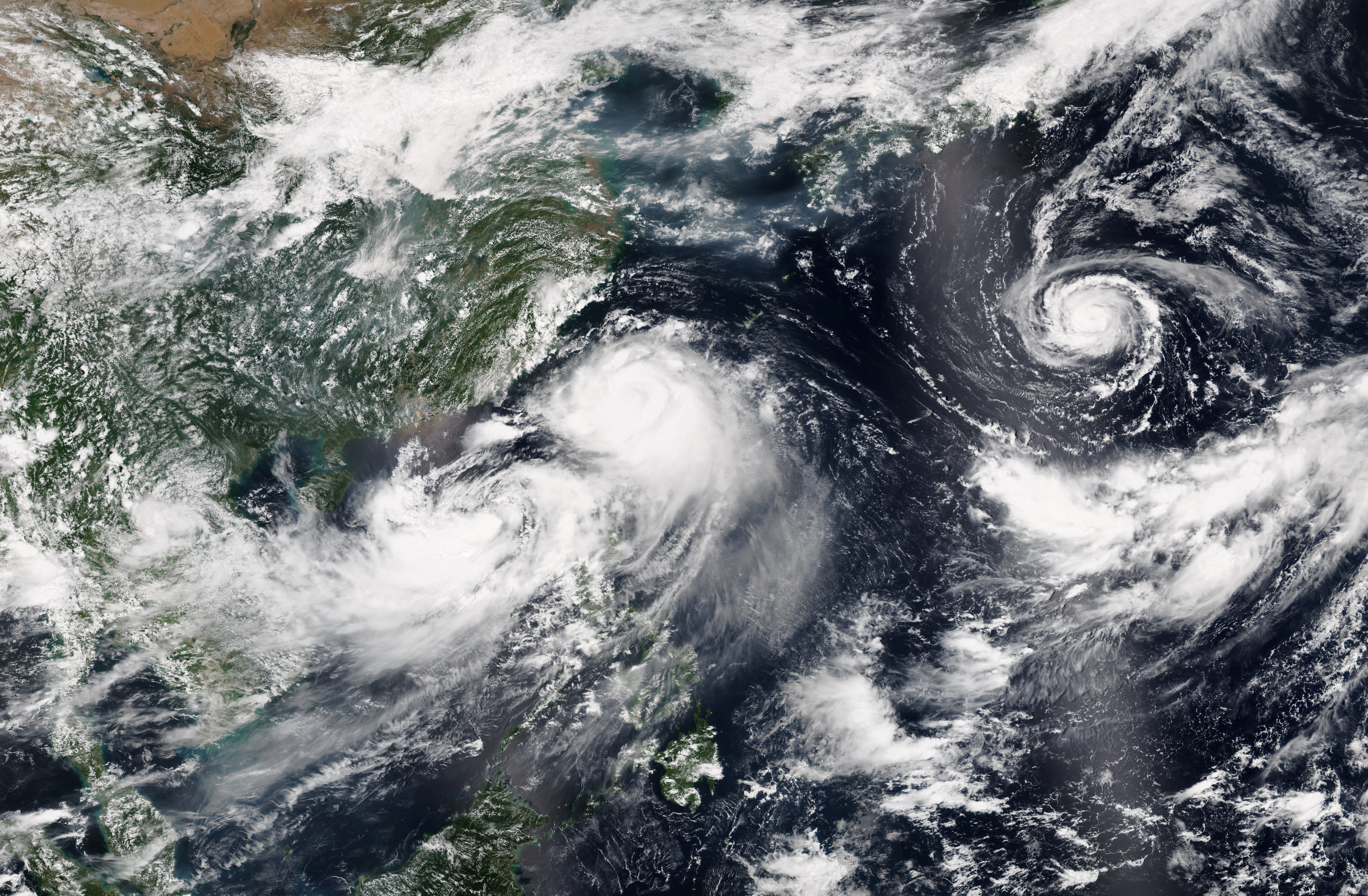
Three tropical cyclones active on the Western Pacific on July 29: Haitang (center-left) over the South China Sea following Nesat (center-right) on approach to Taiwan, and Noru (top-right) traversing the Pacific Ocean. The remnants of Sonca (farthest-left) were also visible over Indochina.

July 29

- 00:00 UTC at 18.3°N 116.3°E — The JTWC assesses Haitang has attained its peak 1-minute sustained winds of 40 knots (74 km/h; 46 mph) as it gradually accelerates.
- 06:00 UTC
  - At 17.9°N 103.8°E — As it weakens and meanders over land, Sonca's central pressure slightly drops to 1002 hPa.
  - At 23.4°N 122.8°E — The JTWC further upgrades Nesat (Gorio) to a Category 2 typhoon as it nears Taiwan.
- 09:00 UTC at 24.1°N 122.4°E — The JTWC reports Nesat (Gorio) has attained its peak intensity with 1-minute sustained winds of 85 knots (157 km/h; 98 mph) and a central pressure of 959 hPa as it is about to make landfall.
- 11:40 UTC (07:40 TST) at 24.8°N 121.8°E — Typhoon Nesat (Gorio) makes landfall on Suao Township, Yilan County.
- 12:00 UTC
  - At 18.0°N 103.6°E — The JMA last notes Tropical Depression Sonca; the system dissipates six hours later over Thailand.
  - At 33.4°N 170.1°E — After recurving to the northwest, the tropical depression near the IDL turns extratropical and accelerates.
  - At 24.7°N 121.8°E — The JTWC downgrades Nesat (Gorio) to a Category 1 typhoon as it crosses northern Taiwan.
- 18:00 UTC
  - At 25.2°N 120.2°E — The JTWC further downgrades Nesat (Gorio) to a tropical storm after emerging over Taiwan Strait.
  - (02:00 PHT, July 30) at 25.0°N 120.3°E — The PAGASA reports Nesat (Gorio) has left the PAR as it approaches China.
- 22:00 UTC (06:00 CST, July 30) at 25.5°N 119.6°E — Nesat makes another landfall on Fuqing City, Fujian Province.

Noru rapidly intensifying on July 30.

July 30

- 00:00 UTC
  - At 23.9°N 141.7°E — Noru re-intensifies to a typhoon as it gradually decelerates near Iwo Islands.
  - At 25.8°N 119.3°E — The JMA downgrades Nesat to a severe tropical storm.
  - (08:00 PHT) at 20.1°N 119.4°E — The PAGASA reports Tropical Storm Haitang has entered the PAR, naming it Huaning after the system made a counter-clockwise loop while it turns to the north-northeast.
- 06:00 UTC
  - At 26.1°N 117.9°E — The JMA further downgrades Nesat to a tropical storm as it pushes inland.
  - At 23.2°N 141.7°E — Typhoon Noru re-strengthens to a Category 2 typhoon as it starts to intensify rapidly.
  - At 21.9°N 120.3°E — The JMA analyzes Haitang (Huaning) has peaked with 10-minute sustained winds of 45 knots (83 km/h; 52 mph) and a central pressure of 985 hPa as it is about to make landfall on Taiwan.
- 08:40 UTC (16:40 TST) at 22.2°N 120.7°E — Tropical Storm Haitang (Huaning) strikes Fonggang, Fangshan Township, Pingtung County.
- 12:00 UTC
  - At 25.6°N 117.0°E — Nesat weakens further to a tropical depression while moving southwest overland.
  - At 22.9°N 141.4°E — Typhoon Noru quickly becomes a Category 4 typhoon as it turns to the west.
  - At 26.0°N 120.2°E — The JTWC last notes Nesat as it weakens to a tropical depression.
  - (20:00 PHT) at 22.5°N 120.4°E — The PAGASA analyzes Haitang (Huaning) has peaked with 10-minute sustained winds of 85 kilometres per hour (46 kn; 53 mph) and a central pressure of 990 hPa as it traverses western Taiwan.
- 18:00 UTC
  - At 41.4°N 162.3°E — The JMA last notes the extratropical remnants of a former tropical depression near the ID; it dissipates six hours later.
  - At 25.0°N 116.0°E — The JMA last notes Nesat as it further weakens overland, dissipating six hours later.
  - At 22.8°N 140.9°E — The JTWC upgrades Noru to a super typhoon (Note: A super typhoon is an unofficial category used by the Joint Typhoon Warning Center (JTWC) for a typhoon with winds of at least 130 kn (240 km/h; 150 mph).) and subsequently attains its second and best peak with 1-minute sustained winds of 135 knots (250 km/h; 155 mph) and a lower central pressure of 922 hPa as it slowly moves westward.
  - At 24.1°N 120.2°E — The JTWC assesses Haitang (Huaning) has attained its lowest central pressure of 992 hPa as it weakens and emerges over Taiwan Strait.
- 18:50 UTC (02:50 CST, July 31) at 25.5°N 119.6°E — Haitang (Huaning) strikes Fuqing City, Fujian Province, almost a day from when Nesat made landfall.
- 21:00 UTC (05:00 PHT, July 31) at 25.7°N 119.4°E — The PAGASA analyzes Haitang (Huaning) has left the PAR as it moves further inland.

July 31

- 00:00 UTC
  - At 22.8°N 140.4°E — The JMA analyzes Typhoon Noru has attained its second and best peak with 10-minute sustained winds of 95 knots (176 km/h; 109 mph) and a central pressure of 935 hPa.
  - At 25.4°N 119.0°E — The JTWC downgrades Haitang to a tropical depression as it moves further inland.
- 06:00 UTC
  - At 27.2°N 117.6°E — The JMA also downgrades Haitang to a tropical depression.
  - At 26.3°N 158.3°E — The JMA marks a tropical depression over the Pacific Ocean northeast of Minamitorishima Island.
  - At 26.5°N 117.8°E — The JTWC last notes Haitang as it weakens to a tropical disturbance.
- 12:00 UTC at 23.0°N 139.2°E — Typhoon Noru gradually weakens back to a Category 4 typhoon as it slowly turns to the northwest, moving away from the Iwo Islands.

=== August ===
'August 1

- 00:00 UTC
  - At 23.6°N 138.2°E — Typhoon Noru weakens to a Category 3 typhoon.
  - At 26.5°N 162.4°E — The JTWC designates the tropical depression now east-northeast of Minamitorishima Island as 13W with a central pressure of 1003 hPa before briefly rising again as the system moves southeastward.
- 06:00 UTC at 30.4°N 116.0°E — The JMA assesses Haitang has turned extratropical near the Yangtze River.
- 12:00 UTC at 24.5°N 137.2°E — The JTWC downgrades Noru to a Category 2 typhoon as it continues to move northwest.

August 2

- 00:00 UTC at 25.6°N 165.4°E — The JMA upgrades 13W to a tropical storm, naming it Nalgae as it turns northwestward.
- 12:00 UTC at 25.9°N 165.4°E — The JTWC follows suit and upgrades Nalgae to a tropical storm.
- 18:00 UTC at 34.1°N 116.2°E — The JMA last notes the extratropical remnants of Haitang as it perishes around the Yellow River, dissipating six hours later.

August 3

- 00:00 UTC at 27.4°N 134.8°E — Typhoon Noru's central pressure slightly drops to 953 hPa, according to the JTWC's analysis.
- 12:00 UTC at 28.3°N 133.2°E — Typhoon Noru further weakens to a Category 1 typhoon as it turns to the west, approaching the Satsunan Islands.

August 4

- 18:00 UTC at 29.3°N 130.5°E — The JTWC reports Typhoon Noru's central pressure slightly drops to 962 hPa as it slowly moves northwest.

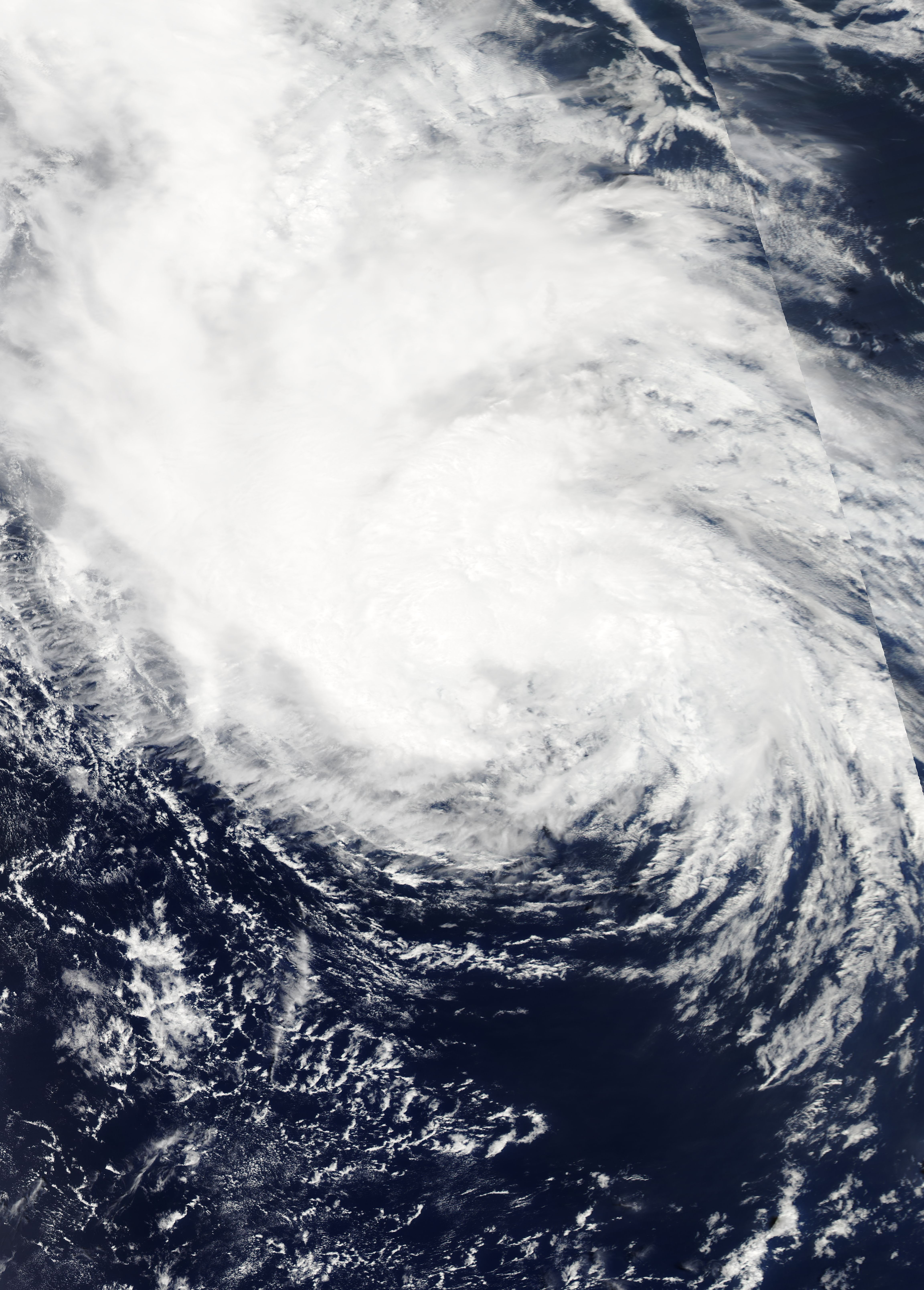
Nalgae shortly before attaining its peak on August 5.

August 5

- 06:00 UTC
  - At 34.2°N 162.1°E — The JMA assesses Nalgae has peaked with 10-minute sustained winds of 45 kn (83 km/h; 52 mph) and a central pressure of 990 hPa as it accelerates north-northwestward.
  - At 34.2°N 162.0°E — The JTWC assesses Nalgae has peaked with 1-minute sustained winds of 55 kn (102 km/h; 63 mph) and a central pressure of 982 hPa as it starts to transition to a subtropical system.
- 12:00 UTC
  - At 30.1°N 130.1°E — The JMA downgrades Noru to a severe tropical storm as it enters the strait between Tokara and Ōsumi Islands.
  - At 36.1°N 161.1°E — The JTWC reports Nalgae has turned to a subtropical system as it continues to move to the northwest.
- 17:00 UTC (02:00 JST, August 6) at 30.3°N 130.4°E — Noru moves over Yakushima Island after turning northeast.
- 18:00 UTC at 38.1°N 160.2°E — The JMA reports Nalgae has turned extratropical well to the east of Japan.

August 6

- 00:30 UTC (09:30 JST) at 30.6°N 131.0°E — As Noru continues to move to the northeast slowly, the system moves over Tanegashima Island.
- 18:00 UTC at 32.5°N 133.0°E — As a low-end Category 1 typhoon, Typhoon Noru's central pressure slightly drops to 968 hPa as it parallels the southern coast of Shikoku.

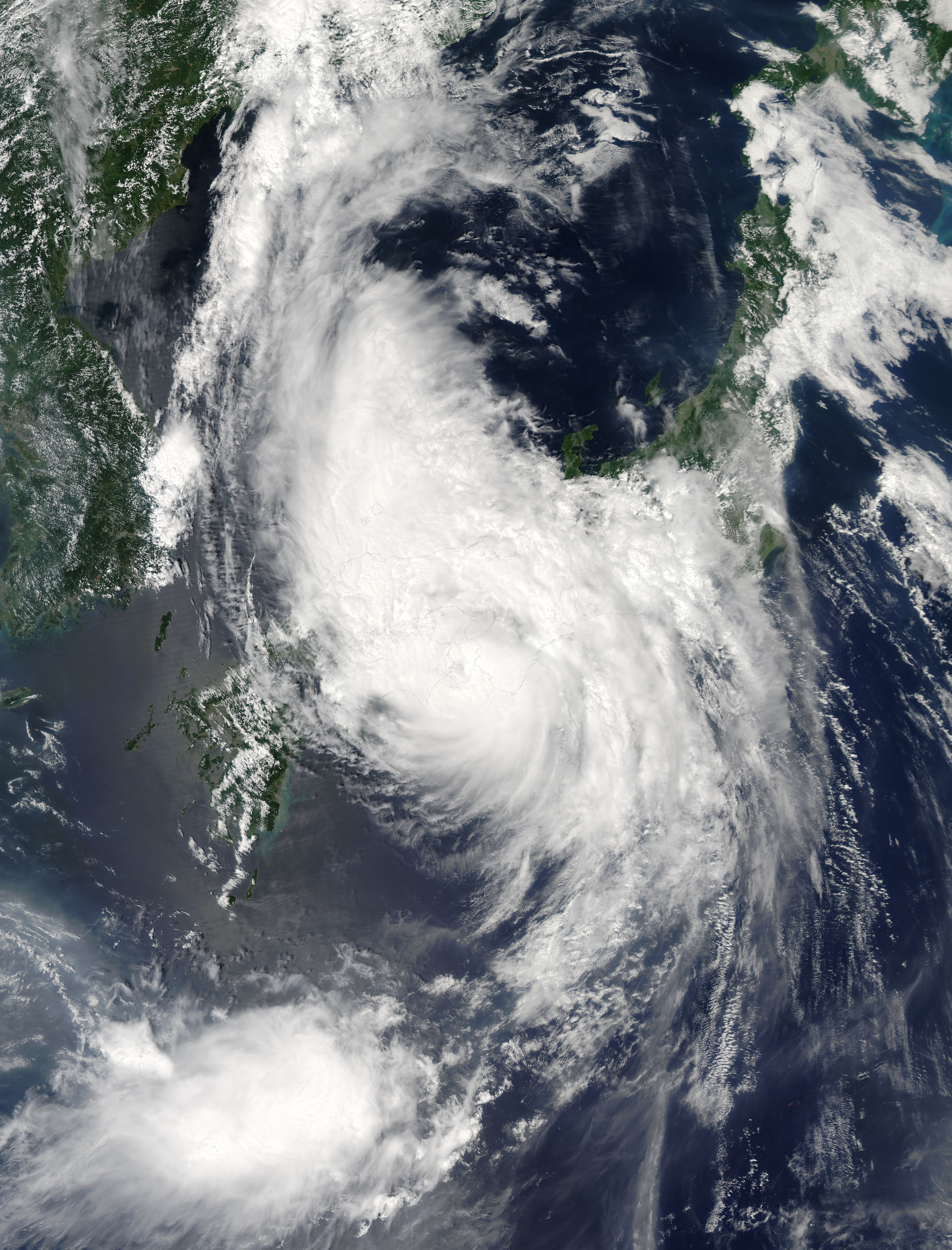
Noru slamming on Japan on August 7.

August 7

- 01:00 UTC (10:00 JST) at 33.3°N 134.2°E — Severe Tropical Storm Noru clips Cape Muroto as it accelerates.
- 06:00 UTC (15:00 JST) at 34.0°N 135.1°E — Noru makes its final strike on Honshu by hitting the northern part of Wakayama Prefecture.
- 12:00 UTC at 35.2°N 136.3°E — The JTWC downgrades Noru to a tropical storm as it moves across Honshu.
- 15:00 UTC at 35.6°N 136.5°E — The JMA further downgrades Noru to a tropical storm.
- 18:00 UTC at 36.2°N 137.0°E — Noru further weakens to a tropical depression as it is about to emerge over the Sea of Japan, according to the JTWC.

August 8

- 06:00 UTC at 38.0°N 138.3°E — The JTWC last notes Noru as it had turned to a weather disturbance emerging off the Sea of Japan.
- 12:00 UTC at 38.7°N 138.5°E — The JMA reports Noru has turned extratropical.

August 9

- 06:00 UTC
  - At 39.2°N 139.3°E — The JMA last notes the extratropical remnants of Noru as it meanders over the Sea of Japan; the system fully dissipates six hours later.
  - At 45.2°N 151.3°E — The JMA last notes the extratropical remnants of Nalgae as it approaches the southern Kuril Islands before dissipating six hours later.

August 10

- 18:00 UTC
  - At 16.0°N 170.9°E — The JMA marks a tropical depression southeast of Wake Island.
  - At 16.3°N 170.7°E — The JTWC designates the tropical depression southeast of Wake Island as 14W with a central pressure of 1004 hPa before rising again as the system moves west-northwest.

August 11

- 06:00 UTC at 17.1°N 168.8°E — The JTWC upgrades 14W to a tropical storm.
- 12:00 UTC at 17.3°N 168.0°E — The JMA names 14W as Banyan after intensifying to a tropical storm.

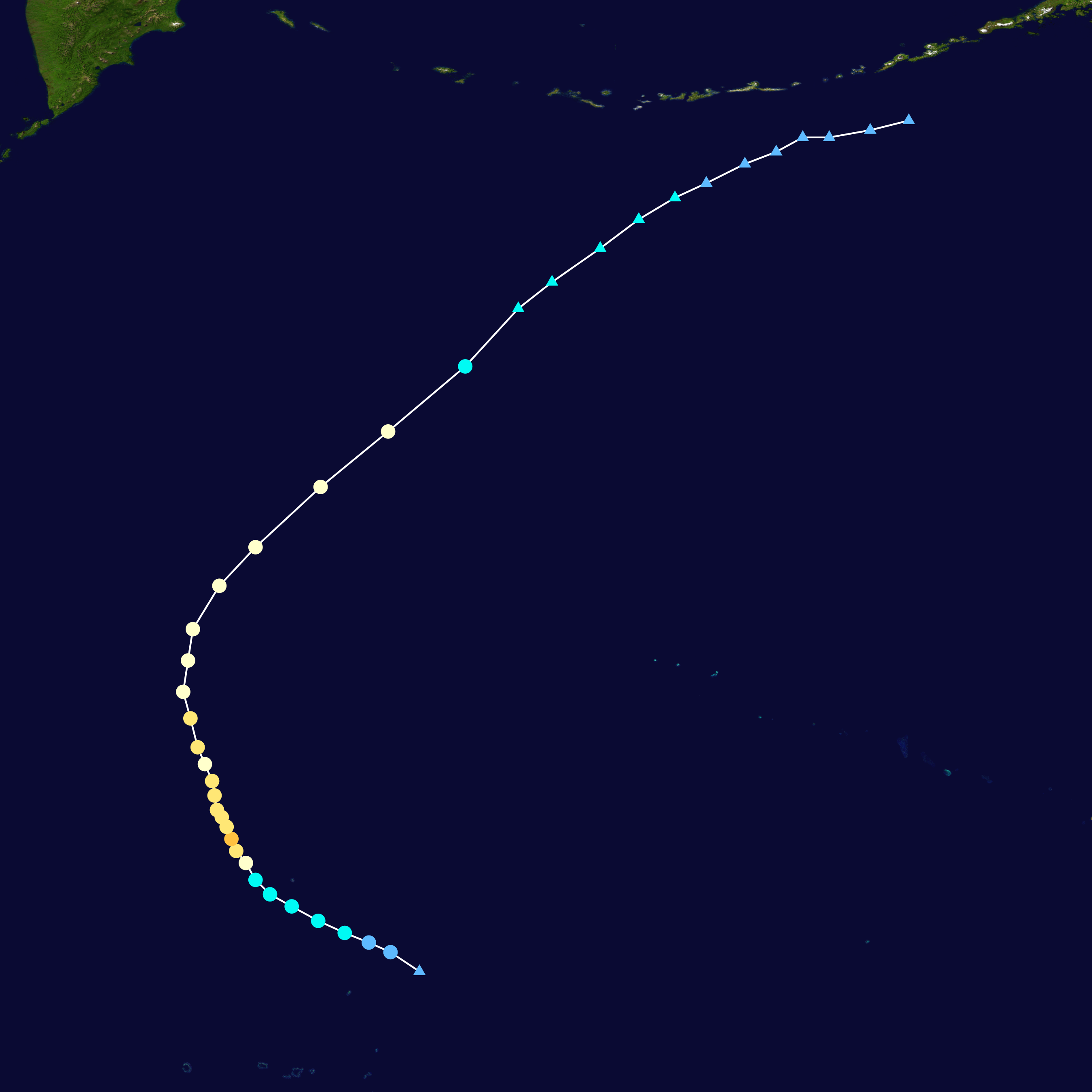
Track of Banyan during mid-August.

August 12

- 00:00 UTC at 18.5°N 165.6°E — Banyan strengthens to a severe tropical storm as it shifts its movement towards the north-northwest.
- 12:00 UTC
  - At 20.0°N 164.6°E — The JMA upgrades Banyan further to a typhoon as it slows down.
  - At 20.0°N 164.7°E — The JTWC upgrades Banyan to a Category 1 typhoon as it intensifies quickly.
- 18:00 UTC at 20.5°N 164.3°E — Continuing to intensify rapidly, Banyan becomes a Category 2 typhoon.
- 21:00 UTC at 20.7°N 164.2°E — The JTWC reports Typhoon Banyan has peaked as a high-end Category 3 typhoon with 1-minute sustained winds of 110 kn (200 km/h; 130 mph) and a central pressure of 941 hPa.

August 13

- 00:00 UTC at 21.0°N 164.1°E — The JMA analyzes Banyan has attained its peak intensity with 10-minute sustained winds of 80 kn (150 km/h; 92 mph) and a central pressure of 955 hPa as it continues to move north-northwestwards slowly.
- 06:00 UTC at 21.5°N 163.9°E — The JTWC downgrades Banyan to a Category 2 typhoon.

August 14

- 12:00 UTC at 24.1°N 163.0°E — As it gradually accelerates, Banyan weakens to a Category 1 typhoon.
- 18:00 UTC at 24.8°N 162.7°E — The JTWC reports Banyan has slightly intensified to a Category 2 typhoon, subsequently attaining its secondary peak with 1-minute sustained winds of 85 kn (157 km/h; 98 mph).

August 15

- 00:00 UTC at 26.0°N 162.4°E — Banyan's central pressure deepens slightly to 959 hPa, according to the JTWC.
- 06:00 UTC at 27.1°N 162.1°E — Typhoon Banyan weakens back to a Category 1 typhoon.
- 12:00 UTC at 28.3°N 162.2°E — The JMA downgrades Banyan back to a severe tropical storm as it turns to the northeast.

August 16

- 12:00 UTC at 35.6°N 167.8°E — The JTWC assesses Typhoon Banyan has slightly strengthened, reaching a third peak with 1-minute sustained winds of 75 kn (139 km/h; 86 mph) and a central pressure of 967 hPa as it speeds up to the northeast.

August 17

- 00:00 UTC
  - At 40.5°N 173.8°E — The JMA further downgrades Banyan to a tropical storm as it interacts with an extratropical low and starts its extratropical transition.
  - At 40.6°N 173.8°E — The JTWC also downgrades Banyan to a tropical storm as it develops fronts.
- 06:00 UTC
  - At 43.0°N 176.0°E — The JMA assesses Banyan has completed its extratropical transition.
  - At 43.0°N 176.4°E — The JTWC last notes Banyan as it turns extratropical.

August 18

- 00:00 UTC at 46.7°N 179.0°W — The extratropical remains of Banyan leave the Northwestern Pacific basin as it approaches the Aleutian Islands.

August 19

- 12:00 UTC at 19.1°N 130.1°E — A tropical depression forms over the Philippine Sea east-northeast of Luzon.

August 20

- 00:00 UTC (08:00 PHT) at 19.3°N 129.3°E — The PAGASA names the tropical depression over the Philippine Sea as Isang as it moves west-northwest.
- 12:00 UTC
  - At 19.7°N 126.9°E —The JMA upgrades Isang to a tropical storm, naming it Hato.
  - (20:00 PHT) at 20.9°N 127.1°E — The PAGASA follows suit, upgrading Hato (Isang) to a tropical storm as well.

August 21

- 00:00 UTC at 20.0°N 125.0°E — The JTWC starts tracking on Hato (Isang) as a tropical depression as the system enters the Luzon Strait.
- 06:00 UTC at 20.4°N 124.0°E — The JTWC upgrades Hato (Isang) to a tropical storm as it closes in on Batanes.

August 22

- 00:00 UTC (08:00 PHT) at 20.4°N 120.0°E — After making a close approach on Batanes, Hato (Isang) intensifies further to a severe tropical storm and achieves its peak intensity within the PAR with 10-minute winds of 90 km/h (49 kn; 56 mph) and a central pressure of 987 hPa, according to PAGASA's analysis, as the system is about to exit the PAR.
- 06:00 UTC
  - At 20.5°N 118.8°E —The JMA declares Hato (Isang) has reached severe tropical storm status now over the South China Sea.
  - (14:00 PHT) at 20.3°N 118.8°E — PAGASA reports Hato (Isang) has left the PAR.
- 12:00 UTC at 20.6°N 117.3°E — The JTWC upgrades Hato further to a Category 1 typhoon as the system continues to move west-northwest.
- 18:00 UTC at 21.1°N 116.0°E — Hato strengthens further to a typhoon, according to the JMA as the system approaches Southern China.

Hato making landfall at peak intensity on August 23.

August 23

- 00:00 UTC
  - At 21.6°N 114.4°E — The JMA reports Hato has achieved its peak with 10-minute sustained winds of 75 kn (139 km/h; 86 mph) and a central pressure of 965 hPa as the system is now due south of Hong Kong.
  - At 21.5°N 114.5°E — Hato strengthens further to a Category 2 typhoon as the system closes in to another landfall.
- 03:00 UTC at 21.9°N 113.6°E — The JTWC reports Hato has peaked with Category 3 typhoon strength, having 1-minute winds of 100 kn (190 km/h; 120 mph) and a central pressure of 948 hPa as the typhoon is about to make landfall near Macao.
- 04:50 UTC (12:50 CST) at 22.3°N 113.6°E — Typhoon Hato makes landfall on Zhuhai, Guangdong.
- 06:00 UTC at 22.2°N 112.8°E — Typhoon Hato weakens to a Category 2 typhoon as it moves further inland.
- 12:00 UTC at 22.7°N 111.0°E — The JMA and JTWC downgrades Hato to a severe tropical storm and tropical storm, respectively, as it continues to weaken rapidly while moving west-northwest inland.
- 18:00 UTC at 23.5°N 109.1°E — The JMA downgrades Hato further to a tropical storm.

August 24

- 00:00 UTC at 14.9°N 128.9°E — Another tropical depression forms over the Philippine Sea east of Luzon.
- 06:00 UTC
  - At 23.8°N 106.0°E — The JTWC downgrades Hato further to a tropical depression as it becomes weaker while traversing westward overland.
  - (14:00 PHT) at 15.5°N 127.5°E — PAGASA names the tropical depression east of Luzon as Jolina.
- 12:00 UTC
  - At 23.8°N 104.5°E — The JMA also downgrades Hato to a tropical depression.
  - At 24.1°N 104.2°E — The JTWC last notes Hato as it weakens to a tropical disturbance as it moves across the western part of South China.
  - At 15.2°N 126.4°E — The JTWC starts tracking on Jolina, designating it as 16W.
- 18:00 UTC
  - At 15.1°N 124.9°E — The JMA upgrades 16W (Jolina) to a tropical storm, naming it Pakhar.
  - At 15.0°N 124.7°E — The JTWC also upgrades Pakhar (Jolina) to a tropical storm as it moves westward.
  - (02:00 PHT, August 25) at 15.3°N 124.9°E — PAGASA follows suit in upgrading Pakhar (Jolina) to a tropical storm as it moves towards Luzon.

August 25

- 00:00 UTC
  - At 23.6°N 99.5°E — The JMA reports Tropical Depression Hato has crossed the 100th longitude, thus entering the North Indian Ocean basin.
  - (08:00 PHT) at 15.1°N 124.1°E — PAGASA reports Pakhar (Jolina) has reached its peak with 10-minute winds of 80 km/h (43 kn; 50 mph) and a central pressure of 993 hPa as the system turns to the west-northwest.
- 12:00 UTC
  - At 16.0°N 122.2°E — The JMA assesses Pakhar (Jolina) has reached its initial peak intensity with 10-minute sustained winds of 45 kn (83 km/h; 52 mph) and a central pressure of 994 hPa as it is about to make landfall.
  - At 16.1°N 122.2°E — The JTWC also analyzes Pakhar (Jolina) to have peaked with 1-minute sustained winds of 45 kn (83 km/h; 52 mph) and a central pressure of 989 hPa.
- 14:00 UTC (22:00 PHT) at 16.3°N 122.1°E — Tropical Storm Pakhar (Jolina) makes landfall on Casiguran, Aurora.
- 18:00 UTC at 13.8°N 112.2°E — A tropical depression forms over the South China Sea east of Vietnam. The JMA analyzes the system having a central pressure of 1002 hPa.

August 26

- 00:00 UTC (08:00 PHT) at 17.5°N 119.5°E — After emerging over the South China Sea, PAGASA reports Tropical Storm Pakhar (Jolina) has re-intensified to its peak within the PAR of 10-minute winds of 80 km/h (43 kn; 50 mph) and a central pressure of 993 hPa.
- 09:00 UTC (17:00 PHT) at 18.6°N 117.1°E — PAGASA reports Pakhar (Jolina) has left the PAR.
- 18:00 UTC
  - At 20.6°N 114.8°E — Pakhar further strengthens to a severe tropical storm as it approaches Southern China.
  - At 14.8°N 110.9°E — The JMA last notes the tropical depression over the South China Sea as it is getting absorbed into Pakhar's outflow, with the system being fully absorbed six hours later.
  - At 17.8°N 147.0°E — The JMA marks another tropical depression east of the Northern Mariana Islands.

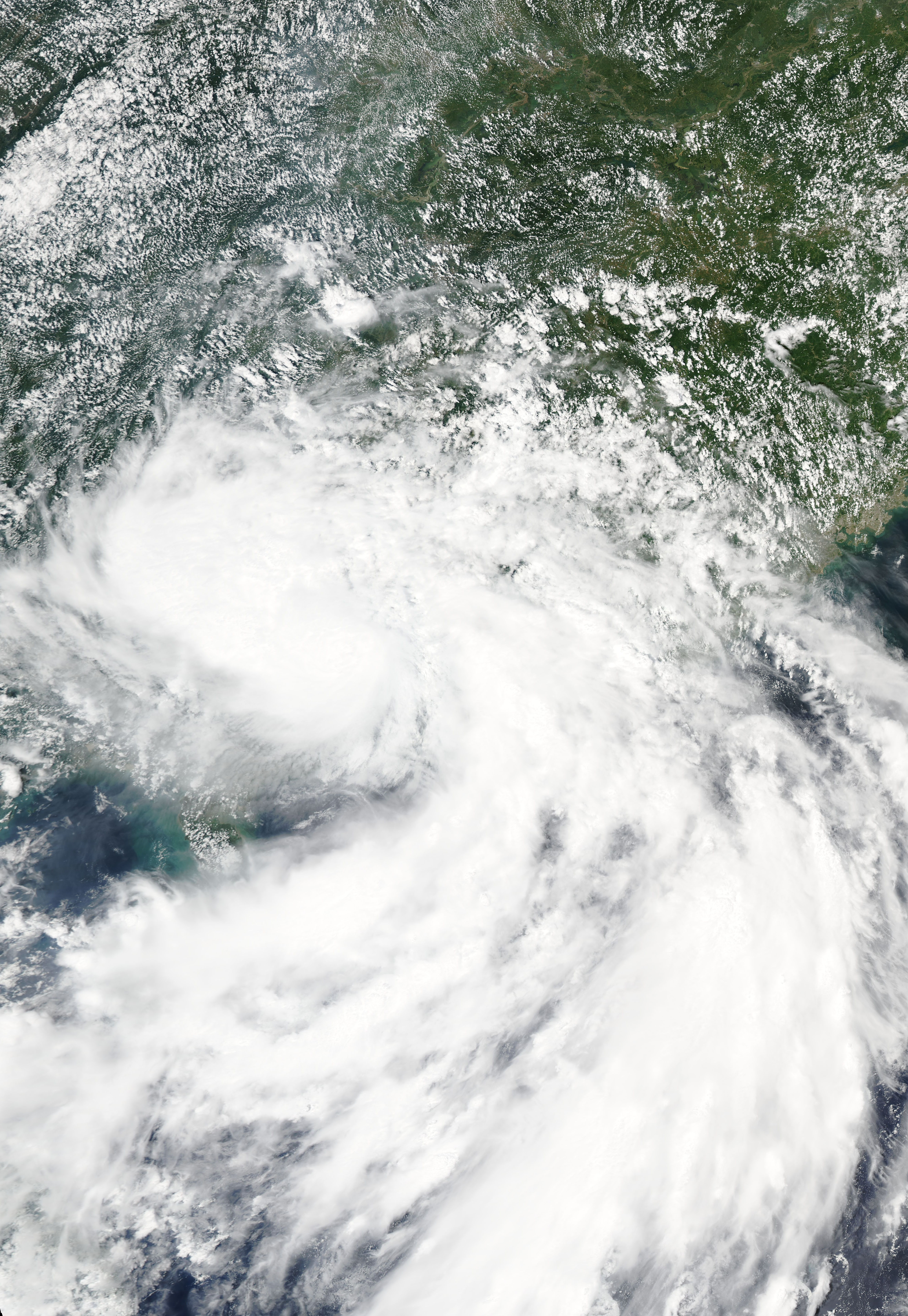
Pakhar after making landfall on China on August 27.

August 27

- 00:00 UTC
  - At 21.8°N 113.4°E — As a severe tropical storm, Pakhar attains its second and best peak with 10-minute winds of 55 kn (102 km/h; 63 mph) and a lower central pressure of 985 hPa as it is about to make another landfall.
  - At 21.9°N 113.4°E — Likewise, the JTWC also analyzes Pakhar achieves a higher peak as a high-end tropical storm having 1-minute sustained winds of 60 kn (110 km/h; 69 mph) and a central pressure of 983 hPa.
- 01:00 UTC (09:00 CST) at 22.3°N 112.8°E — Severe Tropical Storm Pakhar makes another landfall on Taishan County, Jiangmen, Guangdong.
- 06:00 UTC at 23.6°N 111.3°E — The JMA downgrades Pakhar to a tropical storm as it slows down while moving further inland.
- 12:00 UTC at 24.0°N 110.1°E — The JTWC last notes Pakhar as it weakens to a tropical depression based on their analysis.
- 18:00 UTC at 24.7°N 108.8°E — The JMA downgrades Pakhar further to a tropical depression as it turns to the southwest.

August 28

- 00:00 UTC at 24.1°N 108.0°E — The JMA last notes Pakhar over Southern China, with the system dissipating six hours later.
- 06:00 UTC at 19.7°N 147.3°E — While slowly moving northeastward, the tropical depression east of the Northern Mariana Islands becomes a tropical storm with the JMA naming it Sanvu.

August 29

- 06:00 UTC at 22.8°N 147.5°E — The JTWC determines Sanvu has become a tropical storm after forming as a monsoon depression as the system turns to the northwest.

August 30

- 00:00 UTC at 26.9°N 144.2°E — Sanvu strengthens to a severe tropical storm as it turns westward.
- 06:00 UTC at 18.9°N 122.0°E — A tropical depression forms over the Balintang Channel with a central pressure of 1002 hPa before briefly rising.

August 31

- 06:00 UTC at 27.1°N 142.0°E — The JTWC reports Sanvu has become a Category 1 typhoon after executing a tight counter-clockwise loop near the Ogasawara Islands.
- 12:00 UTC at 27.7°N 141.9°E — The JMA assesses Sanvu had intensified to a typhoon as it continues to make an erratic track, turning back to the west and then south.
- 18:00 UTC at 20.0°N 118.9°E — After the tropical depression traversed the Babuyan Islands, the system strengthens to Tropical Storm Mawar as it slowly moves northwestwards over the South China Sea.
- 21:00 UTC at 27.5°N 141.8°E — The JMA analyzes Typhoon Sanvu had reached its lowest pressure at 955 hPa as it completes another tight counter-clockwise loop by moving to the southeast.

=== September ===
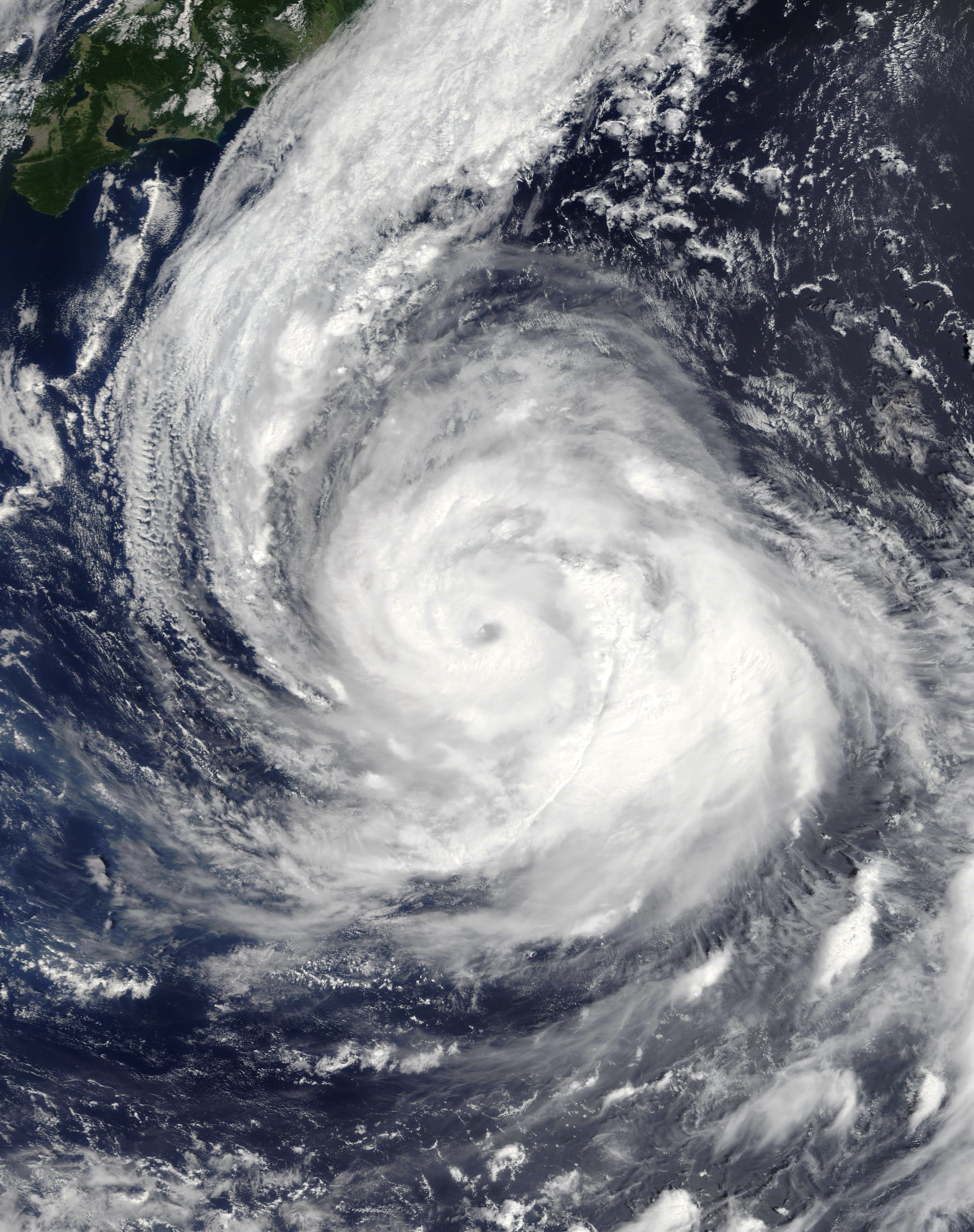
Sanvu shortly after its peak intensity on September 1.

September 1

- 00:00 UTC
  - At 27.3°N 142.0°E — Typhoon Sanvu attains its peak 10-minute winds from the JMA at 80 kn (150 km/h; 92 mph) as it makes a close pass north of Chichijima Island.
  - At 27.2°N 142.2°E — The JTWC also analyzes Sanvu has strengthened to a Category 2 typhoon, subsequently peaking with 1-minute sustained winds of 90 kn (170 km/h; 100 mph) and a central pressure of 953 hPa.
- 12:00 UTC
  - At 28.2°N 143.7°E — Now moving to the northeast, Sanvu weakens to a Category 1 typhoon.
  - At 20.8°N 118.4°E — The JTWC tracks on Mawar as a tropical depression.
- 18:00 UTC at 21.1°N 117.6°E — The JTWC upgrades Mawar to a tropical storm as it continues its slow northwestward movement.

September 2

- 00:00 UTC at 21.0°N 117.4°E — The JMA assesses Mawar has intensified to a severe tropical storm and subsequently peaked with 10-minute sustained winds of 50 kn (93 km/h; 58 mph) and a central pressure of 990 hPa as it slowly approaches southern China.
- 06:00 UTC at 31.4°N 145.3°E — The JTWC downgrades Sanvu further to a tropical storm as it accelerates to the northeast.
- 18:00 UTC at 35.5°N 148.3°E — The JTWC reports Sanvu has turned extratropical.

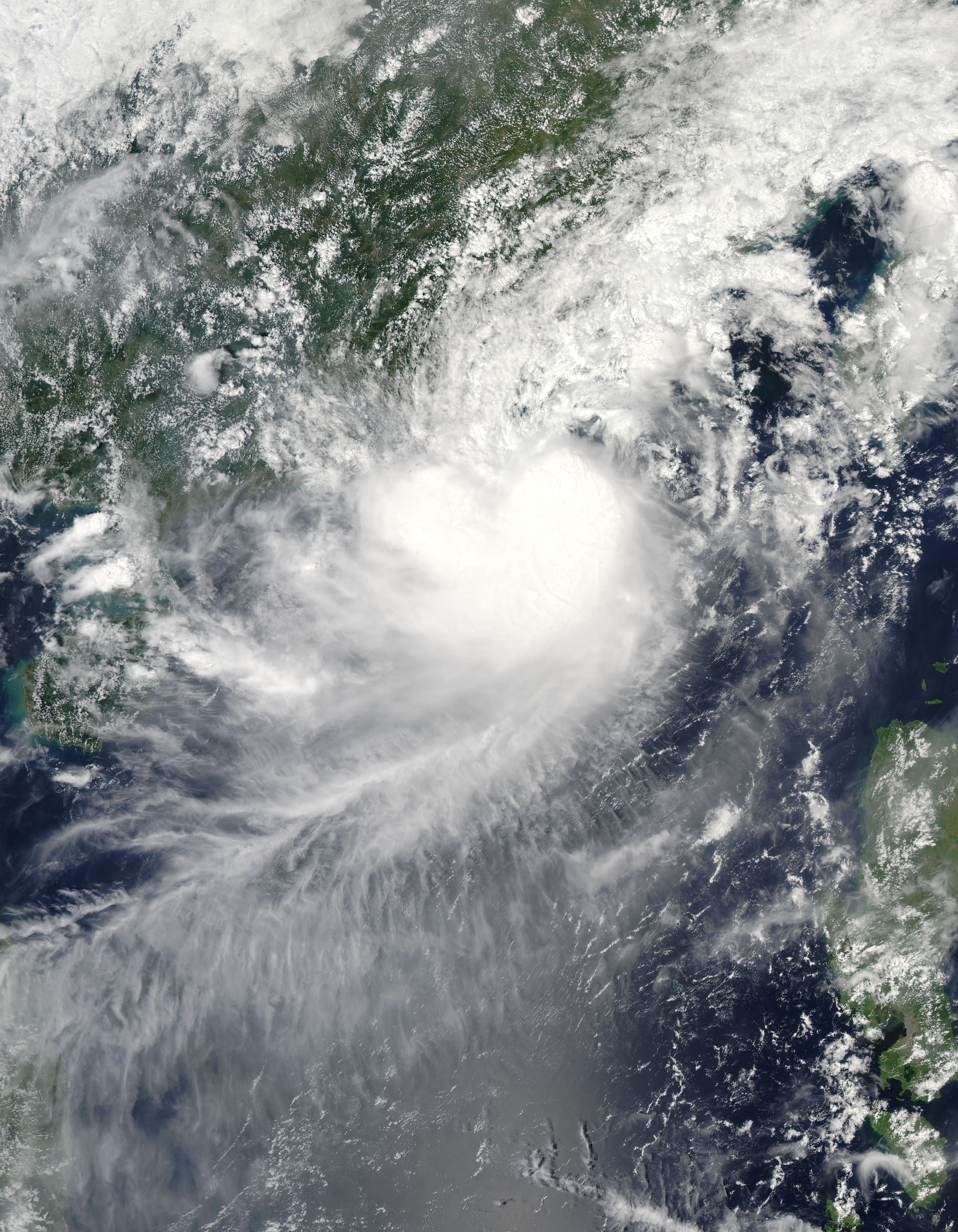
Mawar nearing landfall on China on September 3.

September 3

- 00:00 UTC at 21.9°N 116.7°E — The JTWC analyzes Mawar has attained its peak with 1-minute sustained winds of 45 kn (83 km/h; 52 mph) and a central pressure of 989 hPa.
- 12:00 UTC
  - At 22.6°N 116.1°E — The JMA downgrades Mawar to a tropical storm as it is about to make landfall.
  - At 45.2°N 154.6°E — The JMA determines Sanvu has turned extratropical on their analysis east of Kuril Islands.
  - At 16.1°N 131.8°E — Another tropical depression forms over the Philippine Sea.
- 13:30 UTC (21:30 CST) at 22.8°N 115.4°E — Mawar makes landfall near Shanwei, Guangdong.
- 18:00 UTC at 23.2°N 115.5°E — The JTWC last notes Mawar as it weakens to a tropical depression per the agency's analysis.

September 4

- 00:00 UTC at 23.5°N 114.6°E — The JMA downgrades Mawar further to a tropical depression as it turns to the west.
- 06:00 UTC
  - At 23.5°N 113.2°E — The JMA last notes Mawar as it moves further inland; the system dissipates six hours later.
  - (14:00 PHT) at 16.5°N 127.2°E — PAGASA names the tropical depression over the Philippine Sea as Kiko.
- 12:00 UTC at 16.4°N 126.0°E — The JTWC starts tracking on Kiko as a tropical depression with the designation 19W.

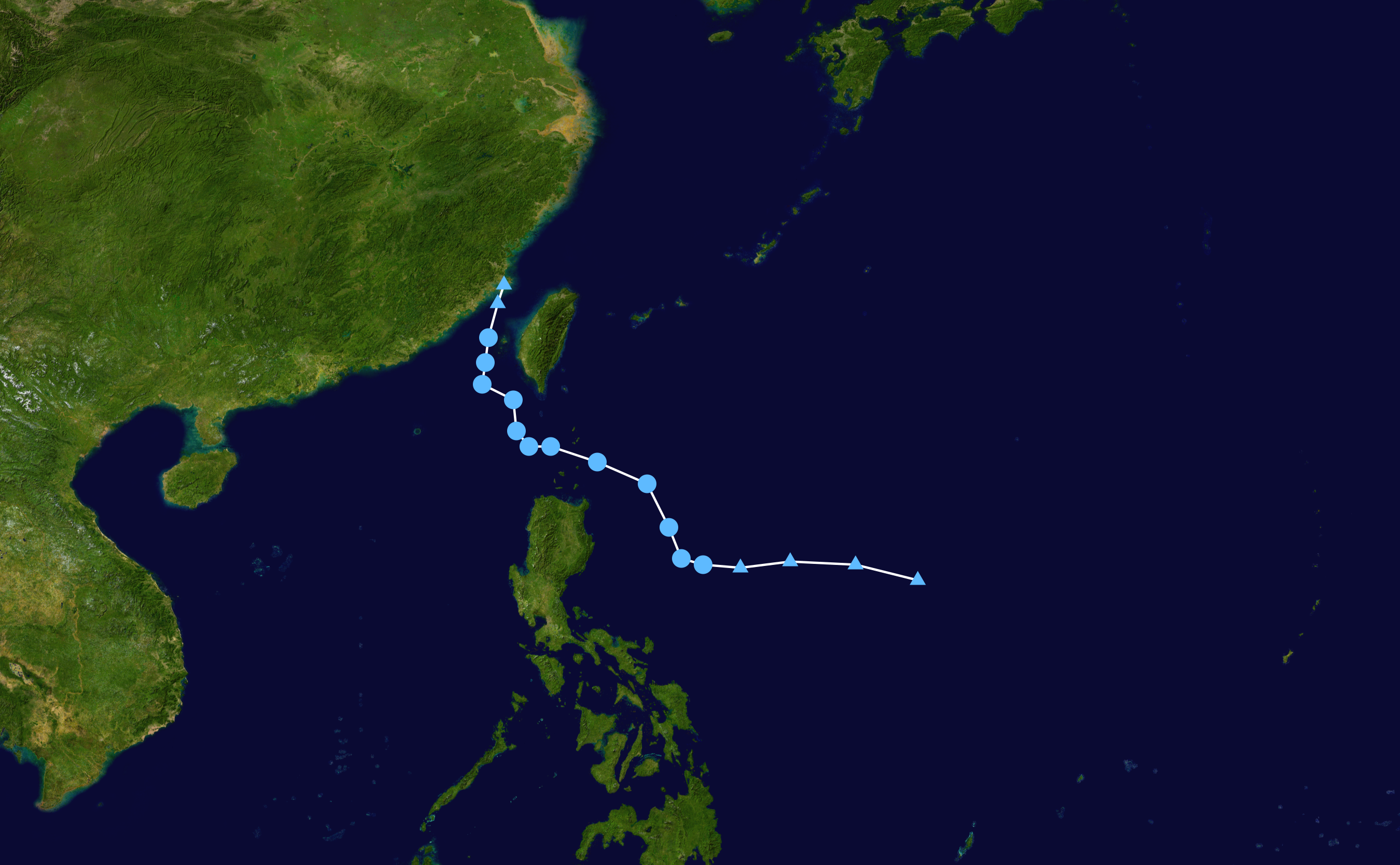
Track of Guchol during early September.

September 5

- 18:00 UTC at 20.3°N 131.1°E — After crossing Balintang Channel, 19W (Kiko) intensifies to a tropical storm, gaining the name Guchol as it later turns to the north. Subsequently, the JMA assesses the system had peaked with 10-minute winds of 35 kn (65 km/h; 40 mph) and a central pressure of 1000 hPa.

September 6

- 00:00 UTC at 20.2°N 120.4°E — The JTWC assesses Guchol (Kiko) peaked as a high-end tropical depression with 1-minute winds of 30 kn (56 km/h; 35 mph) and a central pressure of 1000 hPa.
- 06:00 UTC (14:00 PHT) at 20.7°N 120.0°E — PAGASA reports Guchol (Kiko) has achieved its peak intensity with 10-minute winds of 65 km/h (35 kn; 40 mph) and a central pressure of 998 hPa as it is about to exit the PAR.
- 12:00 UTC
  - At 53.0°N 178.3°W — The extratropical remnants of Sanvu crosses the IDL.
  - (20:00 PHT) at 21.7°N 120.0°E — PAGASA reports Guchol (Kiko) has exited the PAR as it enters Taiwan Strait.
- 18:00 UTC at 22.2°N 119.1°E — The JMA downgrades Guchol to a tropical depression after a brief jog westward.

September 7

- 12:00 UTC
  - At 24.7°N 119.4°E — The JMA last notes Guchol over Taiwan Strait as it moves generally northwards before dissipating six hours later.
  - At 24.8°N 119.4°E — Likewise, the JTWC reports Guchol has weakened to a tropical disturbance.

September 8

- 12:00 UTC at 14.3°N 147.1°E — A tropical depression forms east-northeast of Guam.

September 9

- 06:00 UTC at 15.2°N 144.0°E — The JTWC designates the tropical depression now northwest of Guam as 20W.
- 12:00 UTC at 15.4°N 142.9°E — 20W intensifies to a tropical storm, with the JMA naming it Talim as it continues to move west-northwest.
- 18:00 UTC at 15.6°N 141.6°E — The JTWC also upgrades Talim to a tropical storm.

September 10

- 00:00 UTC at 14.3°N 130.0°E — Another tropical depression forms over the Philippine Sea.
- 18:00 UTC
  - At 17.3°N 137.3°E — The JMA upgrades Talim to a severe tropical storm as it continues its west-northwestward heading.
  - At 17.7°N 136.9°E — The JTWC assesses Talim's central pressure had slightly dropped to 985 hPa before slightly rising again as the system approaches the boundary of the PAR.

September 11

- 06:00 UTC (14:00 PHT)
  - At 18.7°N 134.9°E — PAGASA reports Talim has entered the PAR at typhoon strength and was named Lannie.
  - At 14.7°N 124.4°E — Additionally, PAGASA names the tropical depression over the Philippine Sea, Maring as it is located northeast of Bicol Region.
- 12:00 UTC at 14.8°N 123.7°E — The JTWC starts tracking on Maring, designating it as 21W as it moves westwards towards Luzon.
- 18:00 UTC at 20.2°N 132.2°E — The JMA upgrades Talim (Lannie) further to a typhoon as it traverses the Philippine Sea.

September 12

- 00:00 UTC at 21.4°N 130.6°E — The JTWC follows suit, upgrading Talim (Lannie) to a Category 1 typhoon as its movement became more northwesterly.
- 02:00 UTC (10:00 PHT) at 14.2°N 121.7°E — Tropical Depression 21W (Maring) makes landfall on Mauban, Quezon.
- 06:00 UTC at 22.2°N 129.2°E — The JTWC analyzes Talim (Lannie)'s central pressure dipped to 970 hPa before rising again.
- 12:00 UTC
  - At 14.3°N 119.5°E — The JMA upgrades 21W (Maring) to a tropical storm, naming it Doksuri after exiting the landmass of Luzon.
  - At 14.3°N 119.0°E — The JTWC also upgrades Doksuri (Maring) to tropical storm status.
  - (20:00 PHT) at 14.9°N 119.0°E — PAGASA reports Doksuri (Maring) attains tropical storm strength.
- 18:00 UTC at 14.1°N 118.0°E — The JTWC assesses Doksuri (Maring)'s pressure dipped to 993 hPa before briefly rising.

September 13

- 00:00 UTC (08:00 PHT)
  - At 24.3°N 126.4°E — PAGASA reports Talim (Lannie) has attained 10-minute winds of 130 km/h (70 kn; 81 mph) and a central pressure of 965 hPa as it approaches the Ryukyu Islands.
  - At 14.7°N 116.7°E — PAGASA also reports Doksuri (Maring) has attained 10-minute winds of 85 km/h (46 kn; 53 mph) and a central pressure of 990 hPa as it turns to the west-northwest.
- 06:00 UTC at 24.9°N 125.9°E — Typhoon Talim (Lannie) strengthens to a Category 2 typhoon as it nears PAR exit.
- 07:00 UTC (15:00 PHT) at 25.0°N 125.7°E — Typhoon Talim (Lannie) exits the PAR as it decelerates while moving northwestward.
- 08:00 UTC (16:00 PHT) at 15.6°N 115.4°E — Tropical Storm Doksuri (Maring) also exits the PAR as it traverses the South China Sea.
- 12:00 UTC at 25.5°N 125.3°E — Entering the East China Sea, Typhoon Talim further strengthens to a Category 3 typhoon.
- 18:00 UTC at 15.9°N 113.6°E — Doksuri intensifies to a severe tropical storm as it continues its west-northwestward motion.

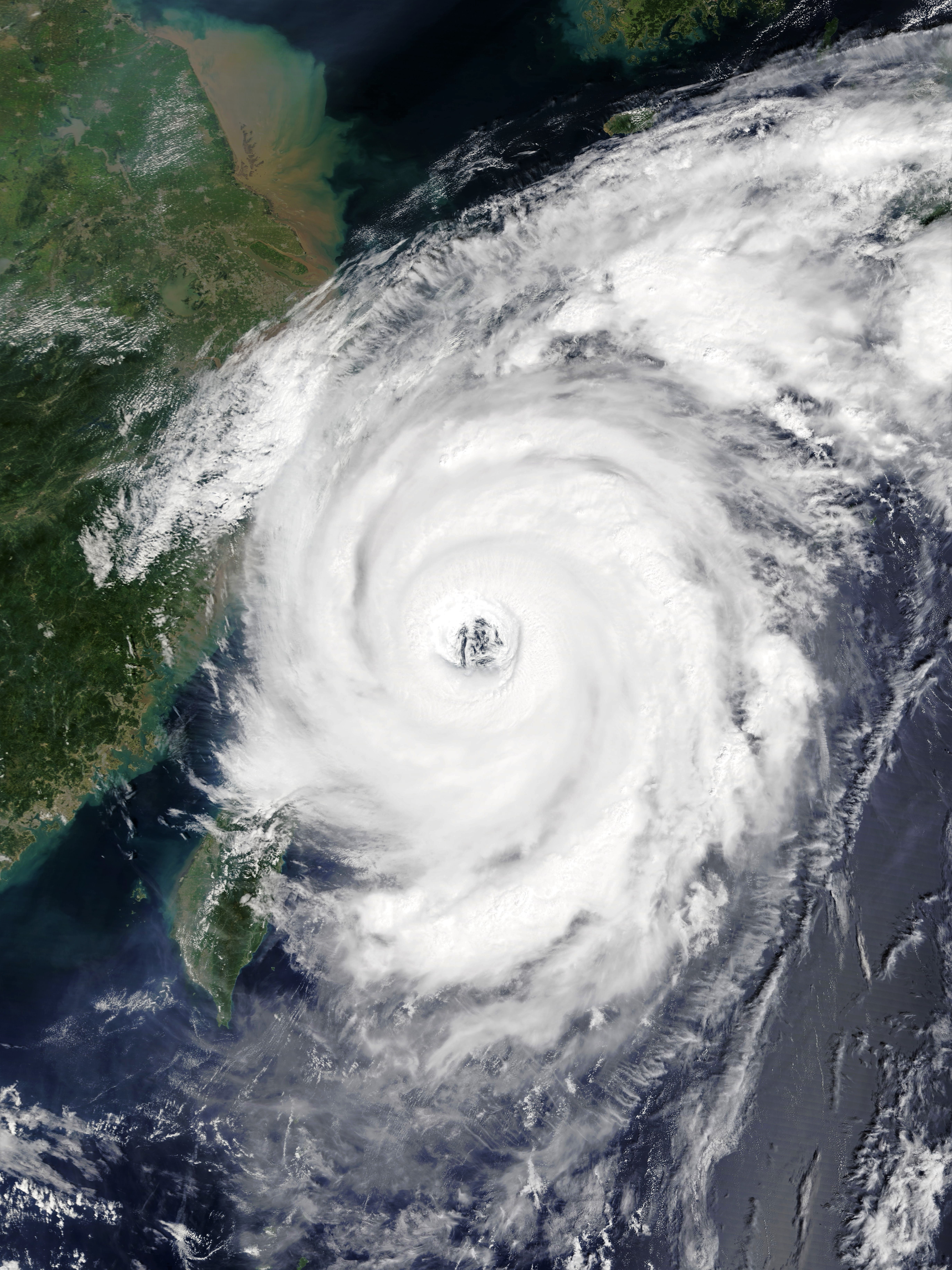
Talim shortly after its peak intensity on September 14 while exhibiting a large eye.

September 14

- 00:00 UTC
  - At 26.6°N 124.6°E — The JMA analyzes Talim has attained its peak intensity with 10-minute sustained winds of 95 kn (176 km/h; 109 mph) and a central pressure of 935 hPa. Likewise, the JTWC reports the typhoon has intensified to a Category 4 typhoon with 1-minute winds of 120 kn (220 km/h; 140 mph) and a central pressure of 933 hPa.
  - At 16.0°N 112.3°E — The JTWC declares Doksuri has become a Category 1 typhoon.
- 06:00 UTC at 16.4°N 111.4°E — The JMA also upgrades Doksuri to a typhoon.
- 12:00 UTC
  - At 17.0°N 109.8°E — The JMA assesses Typhoon Doksuri has attained its peak with 10-minute sustained winds of 80 kn (150 km/h; 92 mph) and a central pressure of 955 hPa located to the south of Hainan.
  - At 16.9°N 109.9°E — The JTWC further upgrades Doksuri to a Category 2 typhoon as it moves towards Vietnam.
  - At 27.3°N 124.3°E — The JTWC downgrades Talim to a Category 3 typhoon as it starts to turn to the north-northeast.
- 18:00 UTC at 27.7°N 124.4°E — Typhoon Talim weakens further to a Category 2 typhoon.

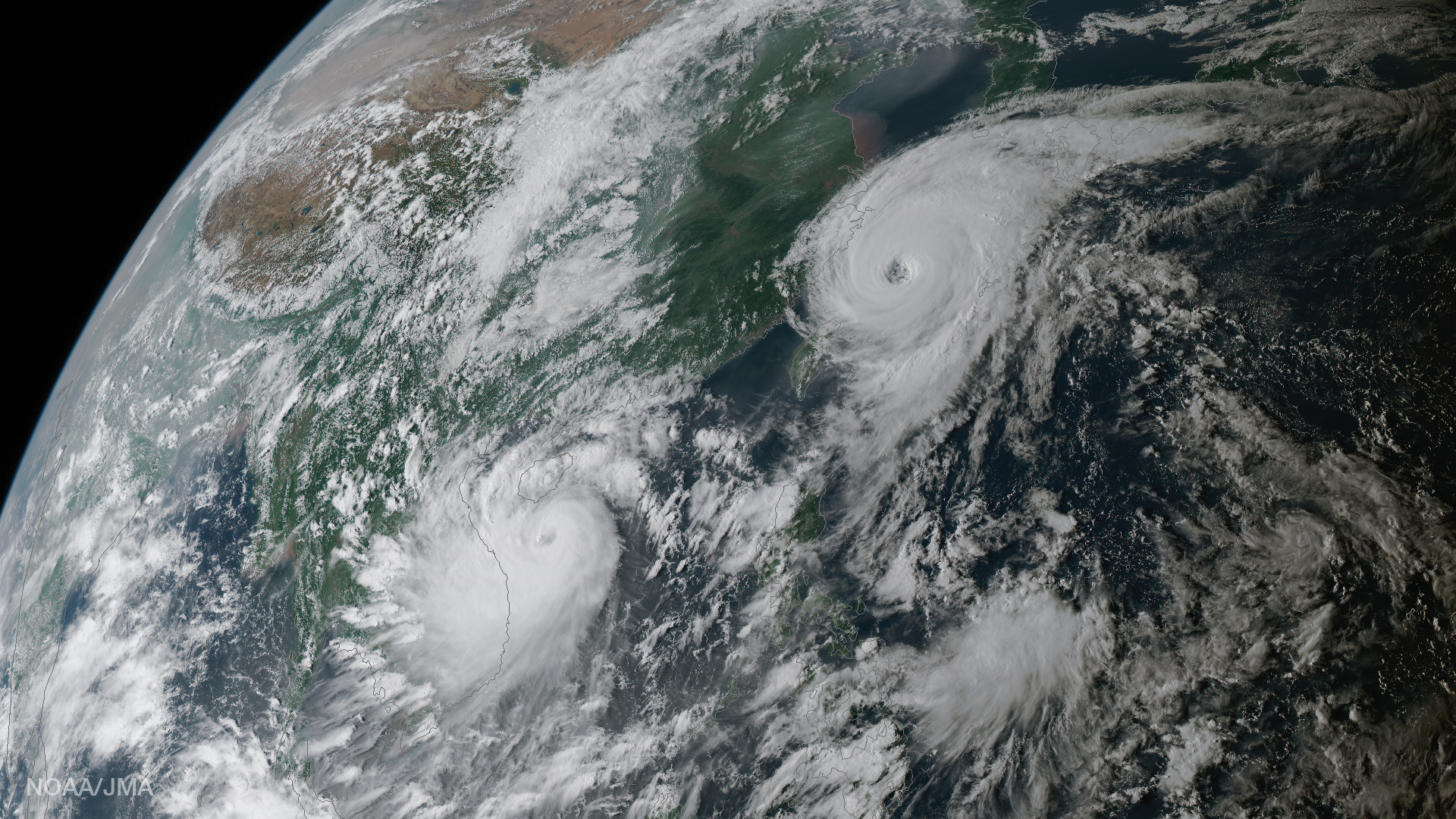
Typhoons Doksuri (left) and Talim (right) late on September 14.

September 15

- 00:00 UTC
  - At 17.6°N 107.3°E — The JTWC reports Doksuri to have attained its peak intensity with 1-minute winds of 95 kn (176 km/h; 109 mph) and a central pressure of 960 hPa as it nearing landfall.
  - At 27.9°N 124.7°E — Typhoon Talim continues to lose strength as it becomes a Category 1 typhoon.
- 03:00 UTC (10:00 ICT) at 17.7°N 106.8°E — Typhoon Doksuri makes landfall near the border of Quang Binh and Ha Tinh provinces.
- 06:00 UTC at 17.9°N 105.9°E — Doksuri weakens to a Category 1 typhoon as it pushes further inland.
- 12:00 UTC
  - At 18.1°N 104.7°E — The JMA downgrades Doksuri to a severe tropical storm as it is now over Laos.
  - At 18.1°N 104.4°E — The JTWC reports Doksuri has rapidly weakened to a tropical storm.
- 18:00 UTC
  - At 18.3°N 102.7°E — The JMA further downgrades Doksuri to a tropical storm as it further degrades overland.
  - At 28.4°N 125.3°E — The JTWC downgrades Talim further to a tropical storm as it accelerates to the northeast.

September 16

- 00:00 UTC
  - At 18.6°N 101.0°E — The JMA last notes Doksuri as it weakens to a tropical depression, with the system dissipating six hours later over Thailand.
  - At 18.6°N 101.1°E — The JTWC also last notes Doksuri, with the system weakening to a tropical depression.
- 06:00 UTC at 28.8°N 126.6°E — The JTWC assesses Talim's central pressure had deepened slightly to 975 hPa.
- 21:00 UTC at 30.4°N 129.5°E — The JMA downgrades Talim to a severe tropical storm as it heads towards Kyushu.

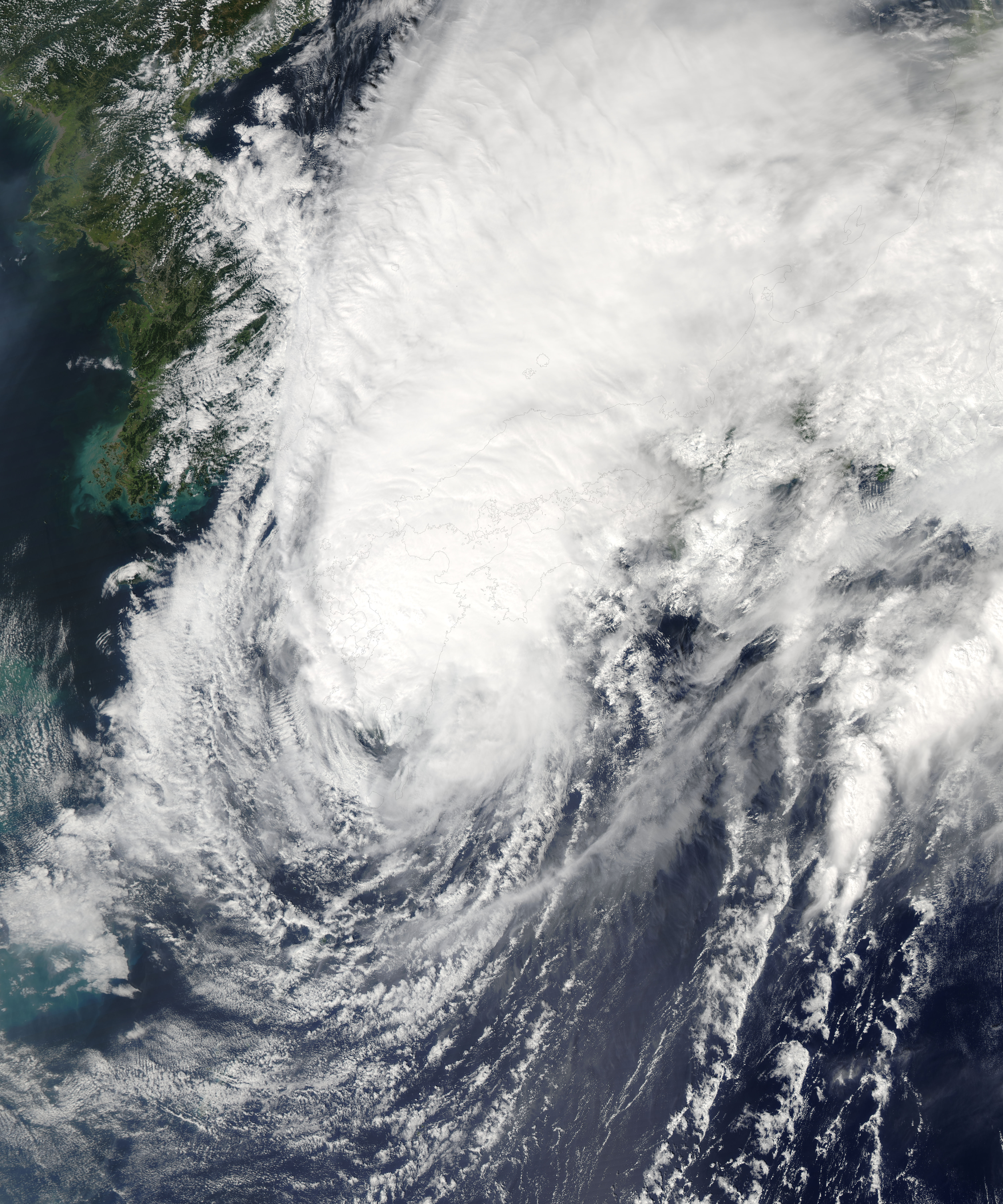
Talim wreaking havoc across Japan on September 17.

September 17

- 02:30 UTC (11:30 JST) at 31.2°N 130.6°E — Talim hits through Satsuma Peninsula, Kagoshima Prefecture.
- 03:00 UTC (12:00 JST) at 31.5°N 130.7°E — Briefly emerging over Kagoshima Bay, Talim makes another landfall on Tarumizu City at the Ōsumi Peninsula on the same prefecture.
- 07:30 UTC (16:30 JST) at 33.4°N 133.4°E — Talim strikes the western part of Kōchi Prefecture on Shikoku after crossing the Bungo Channel.
- 12:00 UTC at 34.1°N 134.4°E — The JTWC reports Talim has turned extratropical as it develops fronts after emerging on the eastern section of the Seto Inland Sea.
- 13:00 UTC (22:00 JST) at 34.7°N 135.0°E — Talim makes its final strike on Akashi City, Hyōgo Prefecture at Honshu after crossing Shikoku.
- 18:00 UTC at 37.8°N 138.7°E — The JMA reports Talim has completed its extratropical transition after emerging on the Sea of Japan.

September 22

- 18:00 UTC at 59.5°N 149.8°E — The JMA last notes the extratropical remnants of Talim over the Sea of Okhotsk, with the system dissipating at 00:00 UTC the next day near Magadan Oblast.

September 23

- 00:00 UTC — The JMA marks a tropical depression over the South China Sea, off the coast of Luzon.
- 06:00 UTC (14:00 PHT) at 16.7°N 118.2°E — PAGASA starts tracking the tropical depression west of Luzon, designating it Nando, also attaining 10-minute winds of 45 km/h (24 kn; 28 mph) and a central pressure of 1004 hPa as it tracks westward.
- 12:00 UTC (20:00 PHT) at 16.9°N 116.7°E — PAGASA reports Nando has left the PAR.
- 18:00 UTC at 18.2°N 114.6°E — The JTWC starts tracking on Tropical Depression Ex-Nando, designating it 22W as it moves towards Hainan. The system has a central pressure of 1004 hPa before rising briefly.

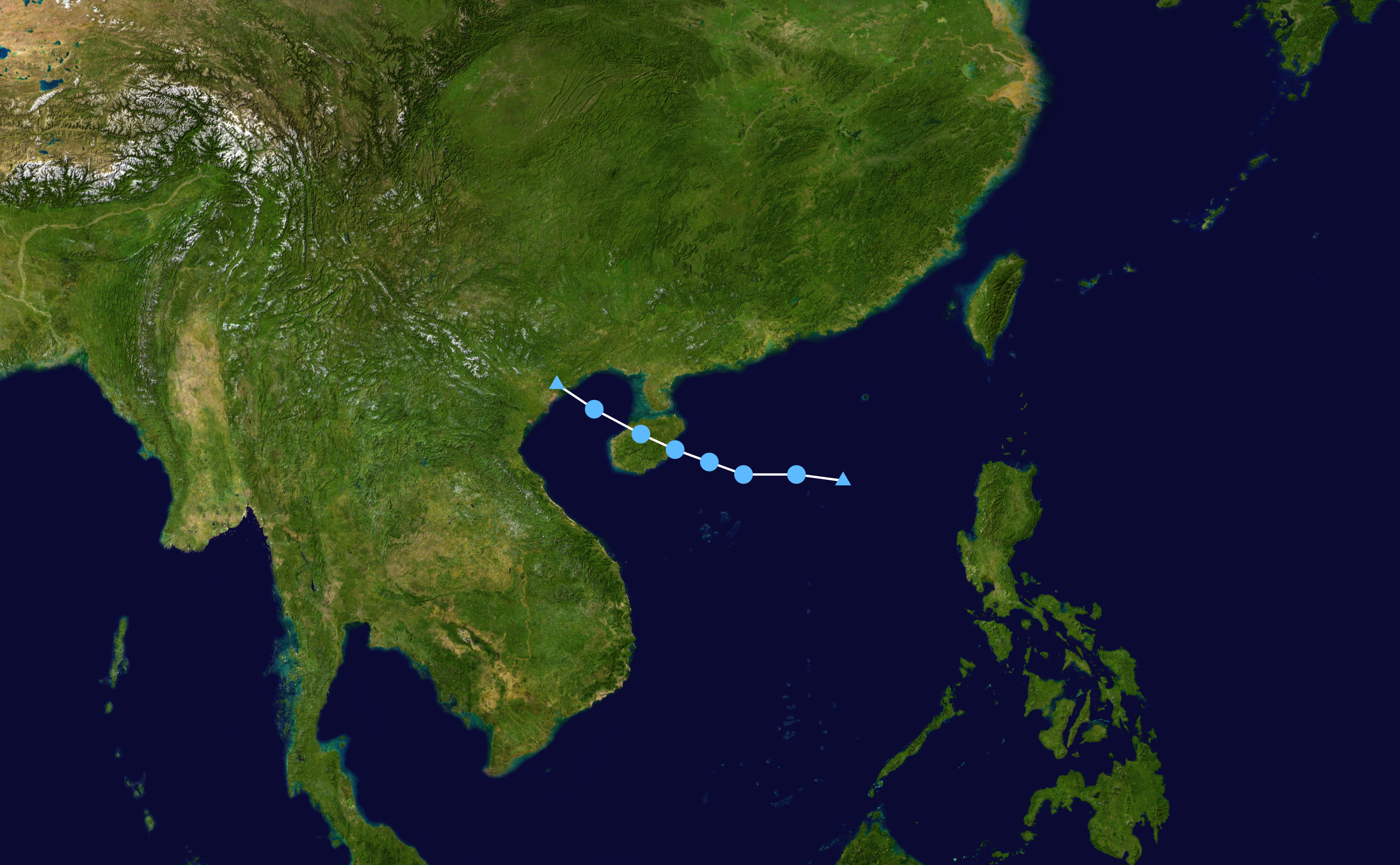
Track of 22W during late September

September 24

- 00:00 UTC at 18.2°N 112.9°E — The JTWC analyzes 22W has attained 1-minute winds of 30 kn (56 km/h; 35 mph).
- 03:00 UTC at 18.3°N 112.2°E — The JTWC analyzes 22W has deepened to its lowest central pressure at 1000 hPa as it moves closer to Hainan.
- 12:00 UTC at 19.0°N 110.7°E — The JMA analyzes 22W having a central pressure of 1000 hPa as it is about to make landfall.
- 13:00-14:00 UTC (21:00-22:00 CST) at 19.2°N 109.7°E — Tropical Depression 22W hits Hainan.

September 25

- 00:00 UTC at 20.3°N 108.1°E — According to the JTWC, 22W re-attains its lowest pressure of 1000 hPa after emerging over the Gulf of Tonkin.
- 06:00 UTC (13:00 ICT) at 21.1°N 106.9°E — The JTWC last notes 22W as it weakens to a tropical disturbance while striking Quảng Ninh province.
- 18:00 UTC — The JMA last notes Ex-22W as it pushes further inland, with the system dissipating at 00:00 UTC the next day.

=== October ===
October 7

- 00:00 UTC at 16°N 126°E — The JMA marks a tropical depression over the Philippine Sea.
- 18:00 UTC (02:00 PHT, October 8) at 16°N 122°E — The tropical depression formerly over the Philippine Sea hits Luzon.

October 8

- 12:00 UTC at 15.6°N 115.0°E — Now over the South China Sea, the JMA assesses the system has attained 10-minute winds of 30 kn (56 km/h; 35 mph).

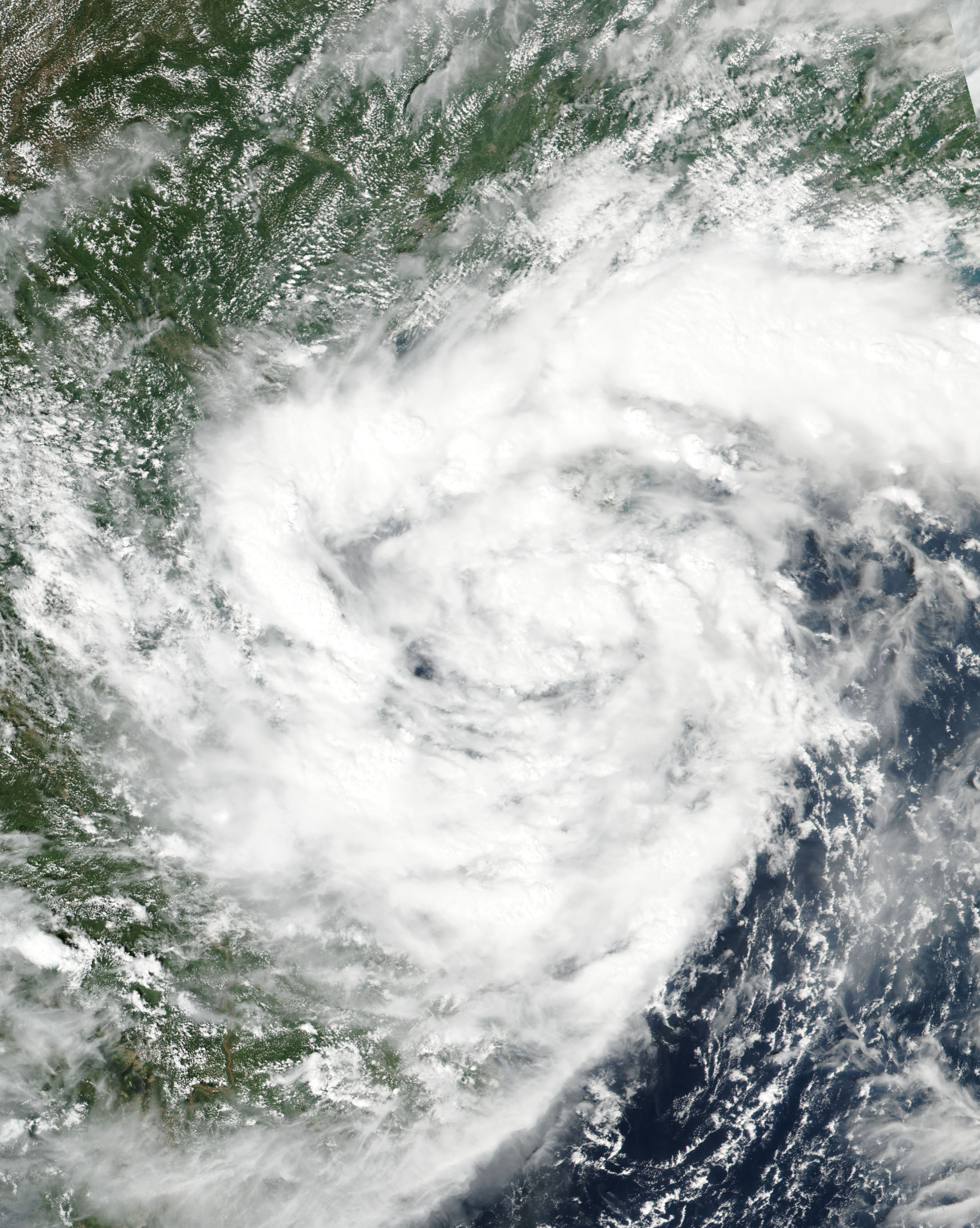
23W hours before its landfall on Vietnam on October 9

October 9

- 06:00 UTC at 16.9°N 110.4°E — The JTWC starts tracking on the tropical depression over the South China Sea, designating it 23W as it moves westwards.
- 12:00 UTC at 17.1°N 109.3°E — The JMA analyzes 23W has attained its lowest pressure of 1000 hPa as it enters the Gulf of Tonkin.
- 18:00 UTC at 17.8°N 107.1°E — The JTWC analyzes 23W has attained its peak 1-minute sustained winds of 30 kn (56 km/h; 35 mph) as it is about to make landfall in Vietnam.
- 21:00-00:00 UTC (04:00-08:00 ICT, October 10) at 18.3°N 105.9°E — Tropical Depression 23W makes landfall on Hà Tĩnh province.

October 10

- 00:00 UTC at 18.4°N 105.6°E — The JTWC analyzes 23W has deepened with its central pressure dropping to 999 hPa as it moved further inland.
- 06:00 UTC at 19.2°N 103.5°E — The JMA and JTWC last notes 23W as it emerges over Laos with the latter assessing the system has become a disturbance; the former analyzes the system dissipated six hours later.

October 11

- 00:00 UTC at 15.5°N 134.0°E — A tropical depression forms over the Philippine Sea.
- 12:00 UTC (20:00 PHT) at 16.8°N 131.0°E — PAGASA starts tracking the tropical depression over the Philippine Sea, naming it Odette as the system moves west-northwestward.

October 12

- 06:00 UTC at 17.8°N 124.1°E — The JTWC designates Odette with the identifier 24W as it nears Northern Luzon.
- 12:00 UTC
  - At 18.5°N 123.3°E — The JMA upgrades 24W (Odette) to a tropical storm, giving the system the name Khanun.
  - (20:00 PHT) at 18.4°N 123.3°E — PAGASA upgrades Khanun (Odette) to a tropical storm as well while the system approaches closer to land.
- 16:40 UTC (00:40 PHT, October 13) at 18.5°N 122.1°E — Tropical Storm Khanun (Odette) makes landfall on Santa Ana, Cagayan.
- 18:00 UTC at 18.5°N 122.0°E — The JTWC upgrades Khanun (Odette) to a tropical storm despite experiencing land interaction.

October 13

- 06:00 UTC (14:00 PHT) at 17.5°N 119.1°E — After emerging over the South China Sea, PAGASA reports Khanun (Odette) has intensified to a severe tropical storm as it veers away from Luzon.
- 18:00 UTC at 16.7°N 118.3°E — The JMA follow suit, upgrading Khanun (Odette) to a severe tropical storm while decelerating.

October 14

- 06:00 UTC
  - At 17.7°N 118.1°E — The JTWC assesses Khanun (Odette)'s central pressure dipped to 982 hPa before rising slightly as the system accelerates to the northwest.
  - (14:00 PHT) at 17.9°N 117.8°E — PAGASA analyzes Khanun (Odette) to have 10-minute winds of 105 km/h (57 kn; 65 mph) and a central pressure of 981 hPa as it is about to exit the PAR.
- 12:00 UTC (20:00 PHT) at 18.7°N 117.5°E — Khanun (Odette) exits the PAR as it turns to a more westerly track.
- 18:00 UTC
  - At 19.5°N 116.4°E — The JMA further upgrades Khanun to a typhoon as it traverses the South China Sea.
  - At 19.4°N 116.3°E — The JTWC assesses Khanun has intensified to a Category 1 typhoon.

Khanun approaching China on October 15.

October 15

- 00:00 UTC
  - At 20.2°N 114.7°E — The JMA reports Khanun has peaked with 10-minute sustained winds of 75 kn (139 km/h; 86 mph) and a lowest pressure of 955 hPa.
  - At 20.0°N 114.8°E — Typhoon Khanun further strengthened to a Category 2 typhoon.
- 03:00 UTC at 20.2°N 114.3°E — The JTWC analyzed Khanun has attained its peak with 1-minute sustained winds of 90 kn (170 km/h; 100 mph) and a lowest pressure of 956 hPa as it moves closer to Southern China.
- 06:00 UTC at 8.8°N 137.3°E — The JMA marks a tropical depression near Yap.
- 12:00 UTC
  - At 20.9°N 111.7°E — The JMA reports Khanun has weakened to a severe tropical storm.
  - At 20.7°N 112.0°E — The JTWC reports Khanun has weakened to a Category 1 typhoon.
  - At 9.5°N 136.8°E — The JTWC designates the tropical depression near Yap as 25W.
- 18:00 UTC
  - At 20.8°N 110.6°E — The JMA further downgrades Khanun to a tropical storm as it is about to make landfall on Leizhou Peninsula.
  - At 20.6°N 110.5°E — The JTWC follows suit, downgrading Khanun to a tropical storm as well.
  - At 9.7°N 136.2°E — The JMA upgrades 25W to a tropical storm, naming it Lan as it slowly moves generally westward.
- 19:25 UTC (03:25 CST) at 20.3°N 110.2°E — Khanun makes landfall on Xuwen County, Guangdong.

October 16

- 00:00 UTC
  - At 20.3°N 109.9°E — Khanun further weakens to a tropical depression as it emerges over the Gulf of Tonkin.
  - At 10.3°N 135.6°E — The JTWC also upgrades Lan to tropical storm status as it is about to enter the PAR.
- 06:00 UTC
  - At 20.5°N 109.3°E — The JMA last notes Khanun as it further degrades, dissipating six hours later.
  - At 20.3°N 109.3°E — The JTWC also last notes Khanun as it weakens to a tropical depression based on their analysis.
- 10:00 UTC (18:00 PHT) — PAGASA reports Tropical Storm Lan has entered the PAR and is given the local name, Paolo.
- 18:00 UTC at 10.7°N 132.7°E — The JTWC reports Lan (Paolo)'s central pressure has dipped to 989 hPa before rising again later on as the system continues its slow motion.

October 17

- 00:00 UTC (08:00 PHT) at 11.0°N 132.8°E — PAGASA upgrades Lan (Paolo) to a severe tropical storm.
- 06:00 UTC at 9.9°N 132.4°E — The JMA reports Lan (Paolo) has become a severe tropical storm as it slowly turns northward.
- 18:00 UTC
  - At 11.0°N 132.6°E — The JMA upgrades Lan further to a typhoon as it gradually accelerates northward.
  - (02:00 PHT, October 18) at 10.6°N 132.6°E — PAGASA also upgrades Lan (Paolo) to a typhoon as the system completes a counter-clockwise loop by turning north.

October 18

- 00:00 UTC at 12.2°N 132.5°E — The JTWC reports Lan (Paolo) has intensified to a Category 1 typhoon while moving northward. The agency also assesses the system's pressure dipped to 977 hPa before slightly rising again.

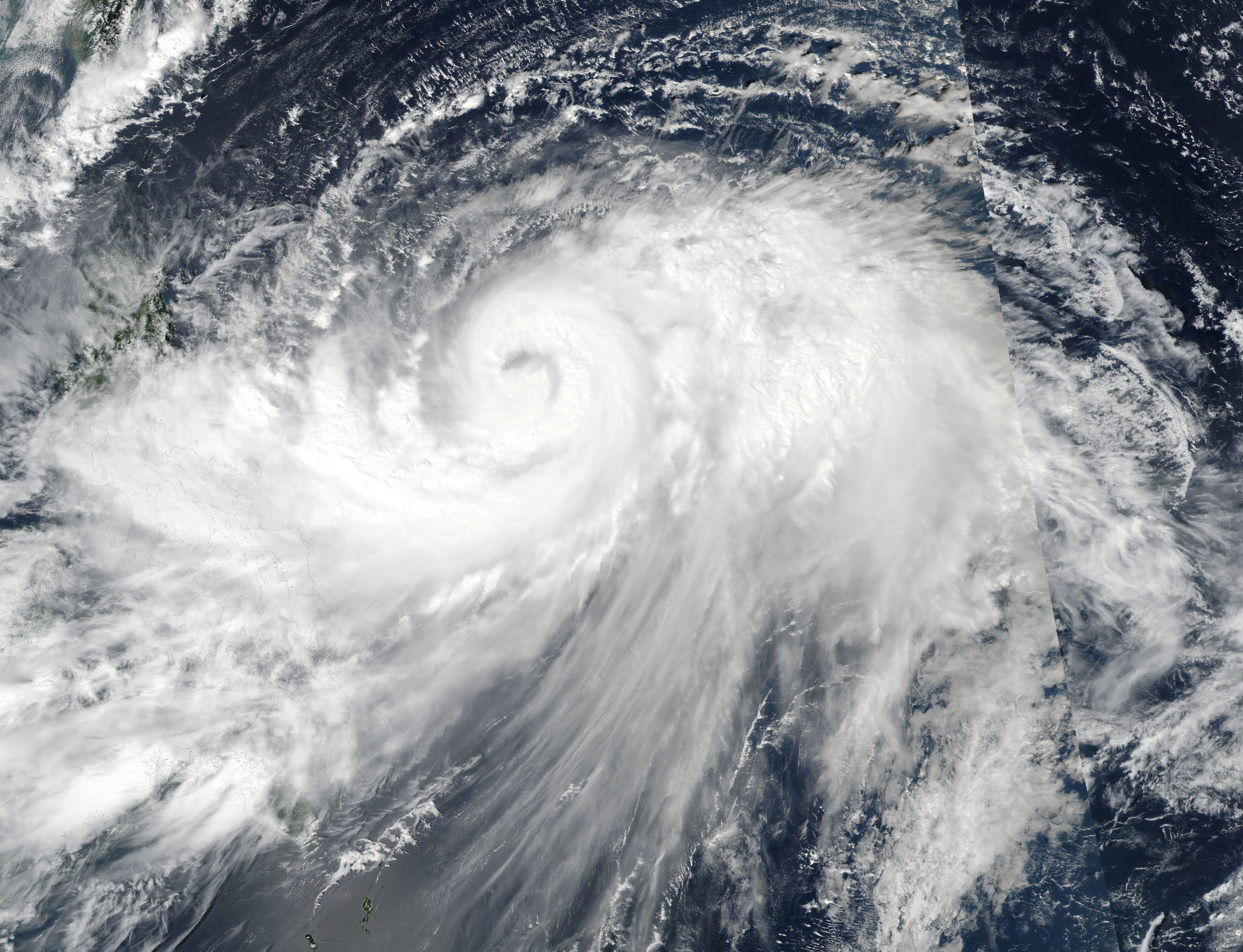
Lan exhibiting a large outflow over the Philippine Sea as it strengthens on October 19, with the Philippines almost covered by Lan's convective bands.

October 19

- 00:00 UTC at 10.4°N 117.1°E — The JTWC reports the formation of Tropical Depression 26W west of Palawan. The agency assesses the system having 1-minute winds of 25 kn (46 km/h; 29 mph) and a central pressure of 1002 hPa.
- 06:00 UTC
  - At 15°N 150°E — The JMA marks another tropical depression east of the Northern Mariana Islands with a central pressure of 1004 hPa.
  - At 16.3°N 130.1°E — After turning northwest, the JTWC reports Lan (Paolo) became a Category 2 typhoon, peaking initially with 1-minute winds of 90 kn (170 km/h; 100 mph) and a central pressure of 956 hPa before weakening slightly.
- 12:00 UTC at 11.1°N 118.5°E — As 26W moves to the east-northeast, the JTWC reports the system has weakened to a weather disturbance as it gets embedded in Lan's large circulation.
- 18:00 UTC
  - At 18.0°N 129.9°E — Typhoon Lan (Paolo) weakens back to a Category 1 typhoon as the system starts turning to the north-northeast.
  - At 11.9°N 151.9°E — The JTWC starts tracking the tropical depression east of the Northern Mariana Islands, designating the system 27W as it moves southwards.

October 20

- 00:00 UTC at 18.9°N 130.0°E — Typhoon Lan (Paolo) re-strengthens back to a Category 2 typhoon as the system starts its rapid intensification.
- 06:00 UTC at 12°N 151°E — The JMA assesses 27W has re-attained a central pressure of 1004 hPa briefly as it turns to the west-northwest.
- 12:00 UTC
  - At 12.2°N 151.0°E — The JMA analyzes 27W to have 10-minute winds of 30 kn (56 km/h; 35 mph).
  - At 20.1°N 130.3°E — Continuing to move to the north-northeast, Typhoon Lan (Paolo) quickly strengthens to a Category 4 typhoon.
- 18:00 UTC
  - At 12.4°N 150.3°E — The JMA reports 27W's central pressure has fluctuated, deepening back to a central pressure of 1004 hPa as it now turns to the west-southwest.
  - At 20.7°N 130.7°E — The JTWC declares Lan (Paolo) has intensified to a Category 4 super-typhoon.

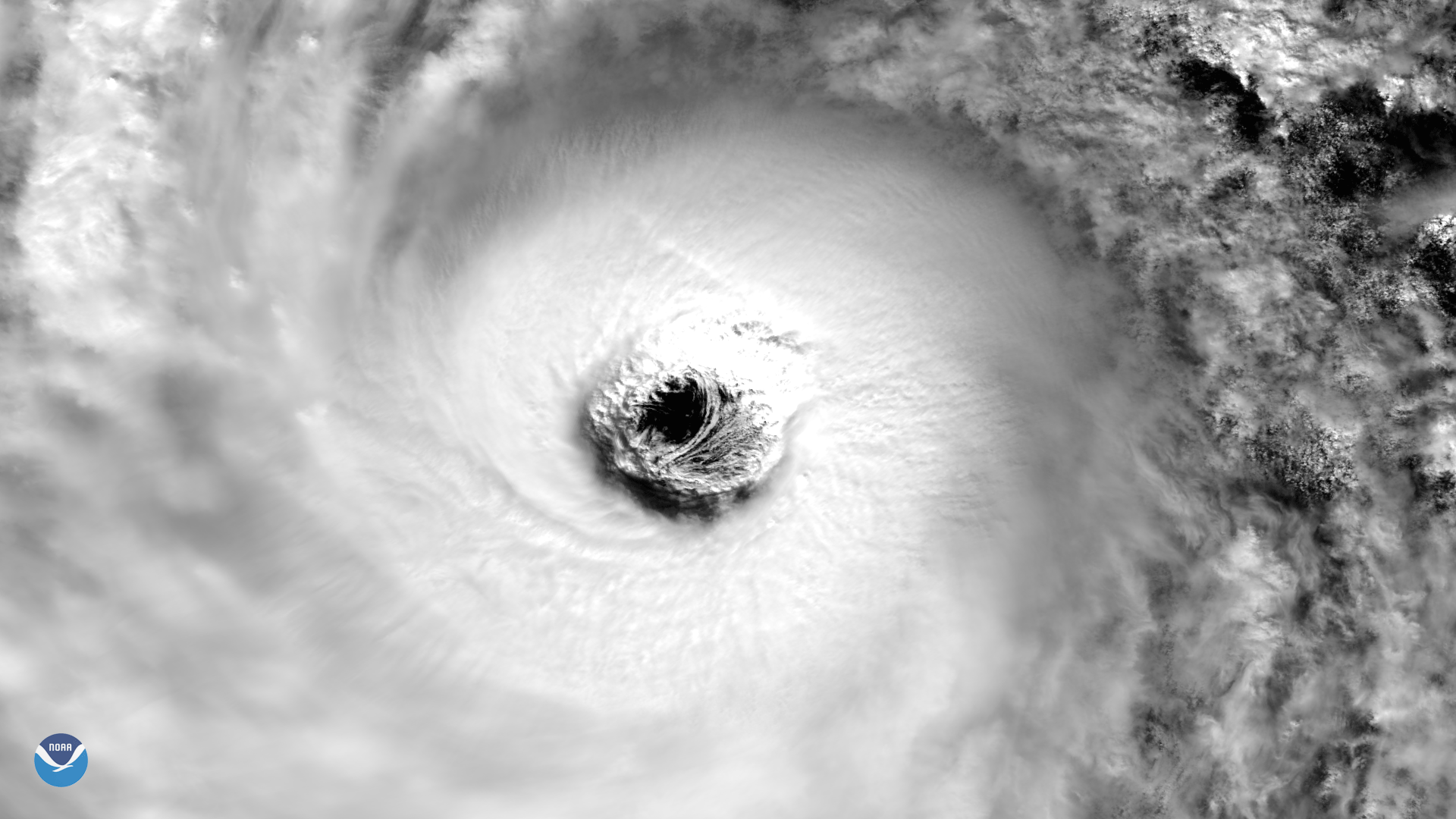
Large eye of Lan at its peak intensity on October 21.

October 21

- 06:00 UTC
  - At 12.3°N 148.9°E — 27W's central pressure fluctuated back to 1004 hPa, according to the JMA.
  - (14:00 PHT) at 22.3°N 132.0°E — PAGASA analyzes Lan (Paolo) has attained its peak with 10-minute winds of 185 km/h (100 kn; 115 mph) and a central pressure of 926 hPa, making the system a super-typhoon. (Note: Since March 23, 2022, PAGASA has defined a super-typhoon as a tropical cyclone with maximum 10-minute sustained winds of ≥185 kilometres per hour (100 kn; 51 m/s; 115 mph).)
- 12:00 UTC at 23.8°N 132.6°E — The JTWC reports Lan (Paolo) has attained its second and best peak with 1-minute winds of 135 kn (250 km/h; 155 mph) and a central pressure of 922 hPa.
- 17:00 UTC (01:00 PHT, October 22) — PAGASA reports Super Typhoon Lan (Paolo) has exited the PAR as it accelerates to the north-northeast.
- 18:00 UTC
  - At 25.6°N 133.3°E — The JMA reports Typhoon Lan has achieved its peak intensity with 10-minute sustained winds of 100 kn (190 km/h; 120 mph) and a central pressure of 915 hPa.
  - At 11.6°N 147.1°E — The JMA last notes 27W as it re-attains a central pressure of 1004 hPa with the system dissipating six hours later.

October 22

- 00:00 UTC
  - At 27.8°N 133.8°E — The JTWC downgrades Lan to a Category 4 typhoon as the system closes in on Japan.
  - At 10.2°N 147.5°E — The JTWC analyzes 27W has strengthened to a tropical storm with 1-minute winds of 35 kn (65 km/h; 40 mph) and a central pressure of 996 hPa.
- 06:00 UTC
  - At 29.9°N 134.6°E — The JTWC further downgrades Lan to a Category 3 typhoon located south of Shikoku.
  - At 9.1°N 148.3°E — The JMA re-designates 27W as a tropical depression again with a central pressure of 1004 hPa. On the contrary, the JTWC downgrades 27W to a tropical depression as it shifts its movement from southeast to west-northwest.
- 12:00 UTC at 32.0°N 136.1°E — Continuing to weaken rapidly, Typhoon Lan degrades to a Category 2 typhoon.
- 18:00 UTC
  - (03:00 JST, October 23) at 34.7°N 138.1°E — Typhoon Lan makes landfall on Kakegawa City, Shizuoka Prefecture.
  - At 34.6°N 138.6°E — The JTWC reports Lan has turned to a Category 1 typhoon-strength extratropical cyclone as the system made landfall on Japan.
  - At 9.1°N 148.0°E — The JMA assesses 27W has re-attained a central pressure of 1004 hPa as it gradually accelerates.

October 23

- 00:00 UTC
  - At 37.2°N 141.5°E — The JMA declares Lan an extratropical cyclone after emerging from Honshu to the Pacific Ocean.
  - At 9.1°N 147.5°E — The JTWC reports 27W has weakened to a remnant low while moving west-northwest.
- 06:00 UTC at 9.3°N 147.4°E — The JMA reports Ex-27W's central pressure continues to fluctuate as it re-attains it again at 1004 hPa.
- 18:00 UTC
  - At 10.2°N 145.4°E — The JMA reports Ex-27W's central pressure lowers to 1002 hPa as it passes south of Guam.
  - At 44.4°N 155.4°E — The JMA last notes the extratropical remnants of Lan southeast of the Kuril Islands as the system gets absorbed by a stronger extratropical cyclone north of it; the system was indistinguishable six hours later.

October 24

- 12:00 UTC at 14.5°N 139.3°E — The JMA upgrades Ex-27W to a tropical storm, naming it Saola, located to the west of Guam.
- 18:00 UTC at 13.6°N 137.1°E — The JTWC begins tracking on Saola after analyzing it to have regenerated to a tropical depression.

October 25

- 00:00 UTC at 14.5°N 135.9°E — The JTWC upgrades Saola to a tropical storm as it is about to enter the PAR.
- 07:00 UTC (15:00 PHT) at 14.5°N 135.0°E — PAGASA reports Saola has entered the PAR and is given the local name Quedan.

October 26

- 00:00 UTC (08:00 PHT) at 17.6°N 132.5°E — PAGASA further upgrades Saola (Quedan) to a severe tropical storm as it turns more northwesterly over the Philippine Sea.

October 27

- 00:00 UTC at 21.3°N 129.8°E — The JMA also upgrades Saola (Quedan) to a severe tropical storm.
- 18:00 UTC
  - At 24.2°N 128.3°E — The JMA analyzes Saola (Quedan) has peaked with 10-minute winds of 60 kn (110 km/h; 69 mph) and a central pressure of 975 hPa as it turns to the north.
  - (02:00 PHT, October 28) at 24.1°N 127.9°E — PAGASA assesses Saola (Quedan) to have 10-minute winds of 100 km/h (54 kn; 62 mph) and a central pressure of 984 hPa as it is about to exit the PAR.
- 21:00 UTC (05:00 PHT, October 28) at 25.0°N 128.1°E — Severe Tropical Storm Saola (Quedan) exits the PAR as it approaches the Ryukyu Islands.

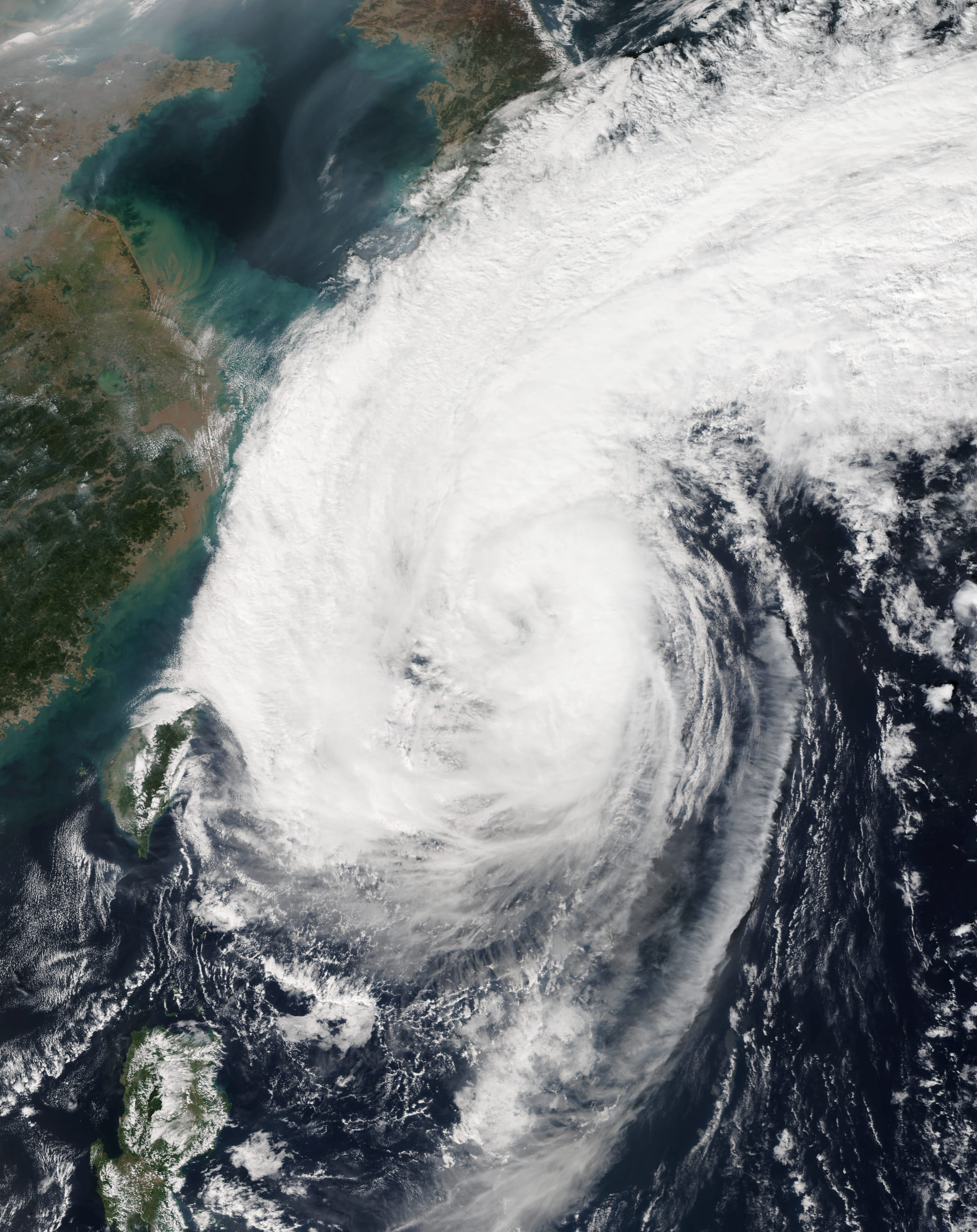
Saola shortly after passing over Okinawa on October 28.

October 28

- 05:00 UTC (14:00 JST) at 26.5°N 127.9°E — Severe Tropical Storm Saola clips the northeastern part of Okinawa Island.
- 06:00 UTC at 27.1°N 128.4°E — The JTWC reports Saola has strengthened to a Category 1 typhoon, subsequently attaining its peak 1-minute winds of 65 kn (120 km/h; 75 mph) as it enters the East China Sea.
- 12:00 UTC at 28.5°N 129.4°E — The JTWC analyzes Saola has also attained its lowest pressure at 974 hPa as it passes close to the Amami Islands.
- 18:00 UTC at 29.9°N 130.6°E — The JTWC downgrades Saola to a tropical storm near the Ōsumi Islands as it shifts its movement to the east-northeast and undergoes extratropical transition.

October 29

- 06:00 UTC at 32.8°N 136.3°E — The JTWC reports Saola has turned extratropical as it parallels the southern coast of Japan.
- 12:00 UTC at 34.8°N 141.1°E — The JMA also assesses Saola has transitioned to an extratropical cyclone, although short-lived, as it gets absorbed by another extratropical low north of the system six hours later.

October 30

- 12:00 UTC at 8°N 112°E — A tropical depression develops over the South China Sea northwest of Borneo with a central pressure of 1006 hPa.

October 31

- 00:00 UTC at 11.0°N 126.8°E — Another tropical depression forms southeast of Samar Island.
- 06:00 UTC (14:00 PHT) at 11.2°N 125.9°E — The JMA analyzes the tropical depression has briefly attained a central pressure of 1006 hPa as the system strikes the southern part of Samar Island.
- 12:00 UTC (20:00 PHT) at 11.4°N 124.7°E — The tropical depression formerly over Samar Island clips the northwestern part of Leyte Island after briefly emerging over Carigara Bay.
- 18:00 UTC
  - At 11.7°N 123.2°E — The tropical depression now over the Visayan Sea re-attains a central pressure of 1006 hPa.
  - (02:00 PHT) at 11.6°N 122.3°E — PAGASA designates the tropical depression as Ramil having formed over the northwestern portion of Panay Island.

=== November ===
November 1

- 03:00 UTC (11:00 PHT) at 11.4°N 120.4°E — PAGASA reports Ramil has been located in the vicinity of the Cuyo Islands.
- 06:00 UTC
  - At 7.3°N 106.8°E — The tropical depression over the South China Sea attains 10-minute winds of 30 kn (56 km/h; 35 mph) as it continues to move towards the Gulf of Thailand.
  - (14:00 PHT) at 11.6°N 120.4°E — PAGASA reports Ramil has reached the vicinity of Calamian Islands.
- 12:00 UTC at 12.1°N 119.0°E — After having crossed the Calamian Islands, the JTWC designates Ramil as 28W as it moves westwards.

November 2

- 00:00 UTC
  - At 12.5°N 117.7°E — The JMA upgrades 28W (Ramil) to a tropical storm, naming it Damrey.
  - At 12.8°N 117.5°E — The JTWC also reports Damrey (Ramil) has intensified to a tropical storm.
  - (08:00 PHT) at 12.3°N 117.4°E — PAGASA follows suit in upgrading Damrey (Ramil) to a tropical storm as it heads westward.
- 06:00 UTC (14:00 PHT) at 12.9°N 116.6°E — The JTWC reports Damrey (Ramil)'s central pressure drops to 989 hPa while PAGASA assesses the system has attained its within-PAR peak with 10-minute sustained winds of 80 km/h (43 kn; 50 mph) and a central pressure of 993 hPa as it moves closer to the boundary of the PAR.
- 18:00 UTC
  - At 12.7°N 114.4°E — The JMA further upgrades Damrey (Ramil) to a severe tropical storm.
  - (02:00 PHT, November 3) at 13.1°N 114.6°E — Damrey (Ramil) exits the PAR.

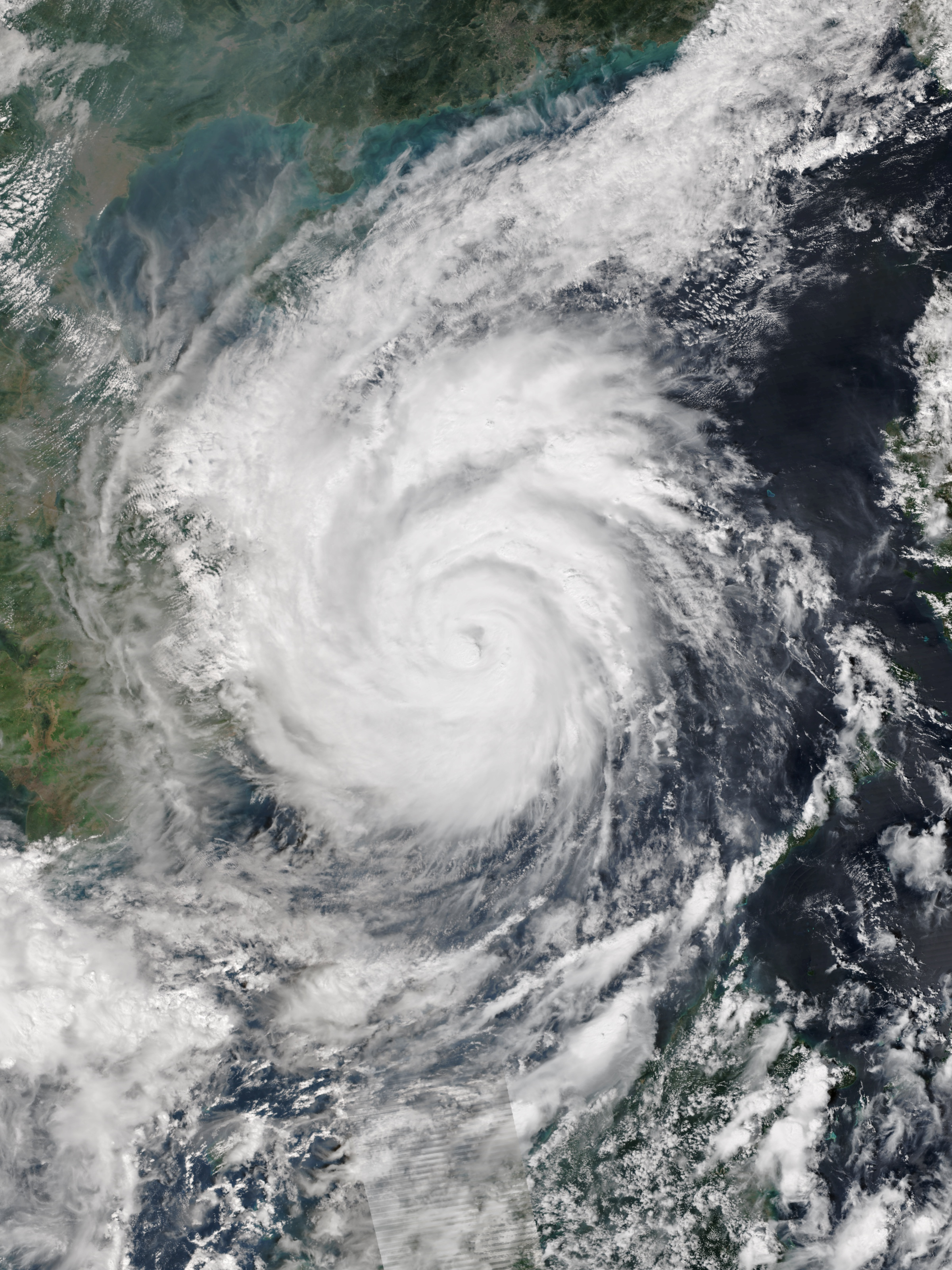
Damrey shortly before its peak over the South China Sea on November 3.

November 3

- 00:00 UTC
  - At 12.6°N 113.5°E — Damrey rapidly intensifies to a typhoon over the South China Sea.
  - At 12.7°N 113.5°E — The JTWC also reports Damrey has strengthened to a Category 1 typhoon with a central pressure of 970 hPa.
- 06:00 UTC at 12.7°N 112.6°E — The JMA analyzes Typhoon Damrey has peaked with 10-minute winds of 70 kn (130 km/h; 81 mph) and a central pressure of 970 hPa as it closes in on Vietnam.
- 12:00 UTC
  - (19:00 ICT) at 7.0°N 101.7°E — The tropical depression formerly over the South China Sea makes landfall on Pattani province on Thailand at the Malay Peninsula while attaining its lowest pressure of 1004 hPa. The JMA also last notes the system, which dissipates six hours later.
  - At 12.8°N 111.6°E — The JTWC further upgrades Damrey to a Category 2 typhoon.
- 18:00 UTC at 12.8°N 110.4°E — The JTWC assesses Damrey has peaked with 1-minute sustained winds of 90 kn (170 km/h; 100 mph) and a central pressure of 967 hPa as it is about to make landfall.

November 4

- 00:00 UTC (07:00 ICT) at 12.5°N 109.1°E — Typhoon Damrey hits Vạn Ninh District, Khánh Hòa Province.
- 06:00 UTC
  - At 12.4°N 107.7°E — Damrey weakens to a severe tropical storm per the JMA.
  - At 12.4°N 107.8°E — The JTWC downgrades Damrey to a tropical storm.
- 12:00 UTC
  - At 12.4°N 106.4°E — The JMA follows suit, downgrading Damrey to a tropical storm after emerging over Cambodia.
  - At 5.6°N 100.3°E — The JTWC designates the remnants of a former tropical depression now on the west coast of the Malay Peninsula as 29W with 1-minute winds of 25 kn (46 km/h; 29 mph) and a central pressure of 1004 hPa.
- 18:00 UTC
  - At 13.2°N 105.6°E — The JMA last notes Damrey as it weakens to a tropical depression as it turns to the northwest, with the system dissipating at 00:00 UTC the next day.
  - At 12.8°N 105.3°E — The JTWC last notes and downgrades Damrey to a tropical depression as it moves further inland.

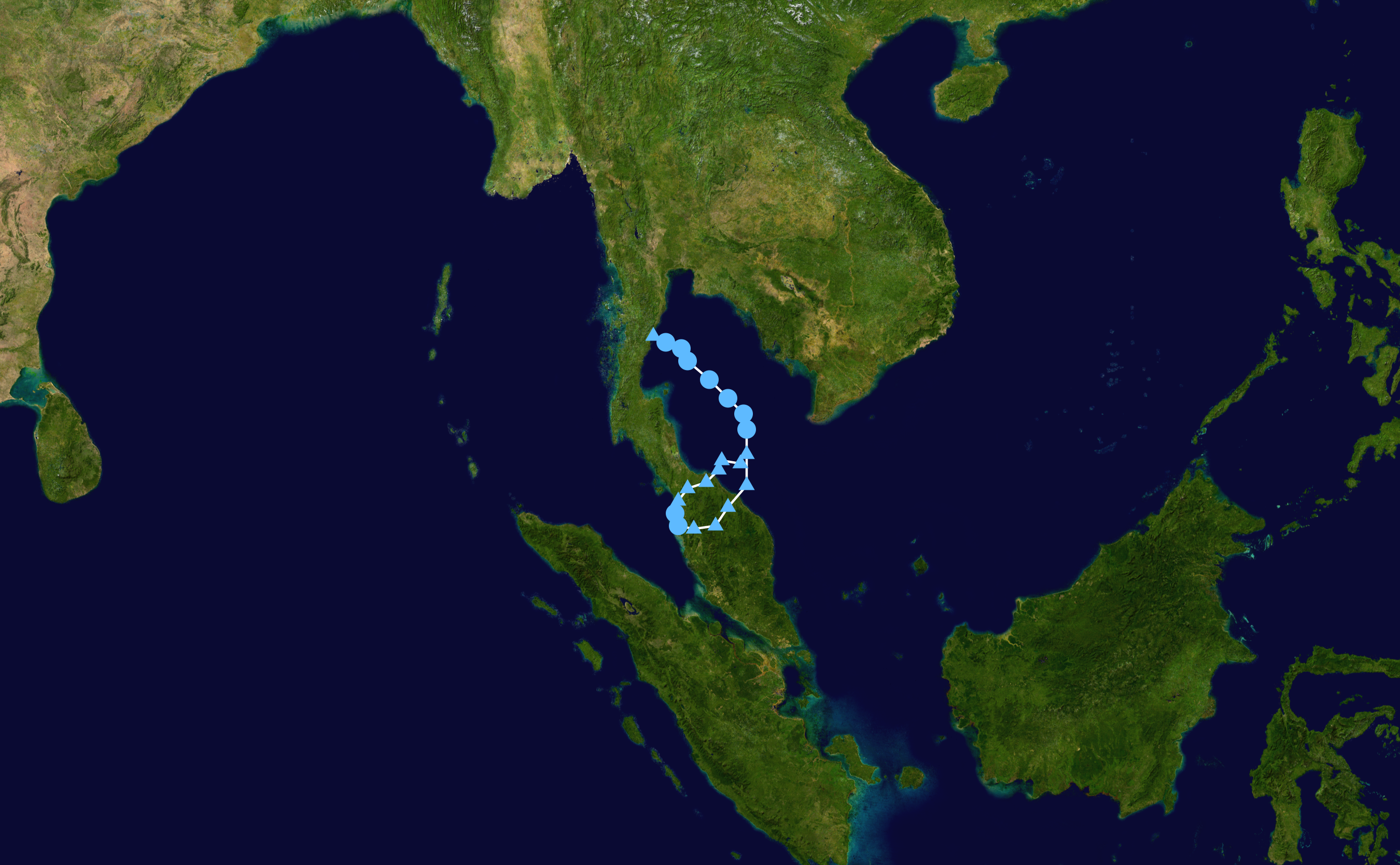
Erratic track of 29W during early November, which caused the 2017 Malaysian floods.

November 5

- 00:00 UTC at 5.1°N 100.9°E — After 29W loops back to the Malay Peninsula, the JTWC downgrades it to a weather disturbance.

November 6

- 06:00 UTC at 8.3°N 102.6°E — After having completed a counter-clockwise loop over the Gulf of Thailand and the Malay Peninsula, the JTWC reports remnants of 29W have regenerated to a tropical depression again after emerging over the gulf with 1-minute winds of 25 kn (46 km/h; 29 mph).
- 12:00 UTC at 9°N 102°E — The JMA also starts tracking again 29W with a central pressure of 1006 hPa.
- 18:00 UTC at 9.3°N 102.0°E — The JTWC reports 29W's central pressure dipped down to 1004 hPa after the system turned to the northwest.

November 7

- 06:00 UTC at 10°N 101°E — The JMA last notes 29W as it heads to the northern part of the Malay Peninsula; the system becomes untraceable six hours later.
- 12:00 UTC at 10.1°N 134.2°E — The JMA marks another tropical depression north-northwest of Palau.

November 8

- 00:00 UTC at 11.3°N 99.6°E — The JTWC last notes 29W as it weakens to a disturbance on approach to its final landfall on the northern part of the Malay Peninsula, near Prachuap Khiri Khan province.
- 06:00 UTC at 11.0°N 129.0°E — The JMA assesses the tropical depression now northwest of Palau deepens its central pressure to 1004 hPa before rising again as the system approaches Samar Island.
- 18:00 UTC
  - At 12.1°N 125.6°E — The tropical depression's central pressure fluctuates back to 1004 hPa as it is about to hit Samar Island.
  - At 12.3°N 125.8°E — The JTWC starts tracking on the tropical depression near Samar Island, designating it 30W.
- 19:00-19:30 PHT (03:00-03:30 PHT, November 9) — Tropical Depression 30W hits Samar Island.
- 21:00 UTC (05:00 PHT, November 9) at 12.4°N 125.0°E — PAGASA starts tracking 30W, designating it Salome over Samar Island.

Pre-Haikui traversing the Philippines on November 9.

November 9

- 03:00 UTC (11:00 PHT) at 13.1°N 123.7°E — PAGASA reports 30W (Salome) has been located in the vicinity of Legazpi City, Albay.
- 06:00 UTC (14:00 PHT) at 13.1°N 123.0°E — After briefly crossing Burias Pass, 30W (Salome) hits the northern portion of Burias Island.
- 08:00-09:00 UTC (16:00-17:00 PHT) at 13.4°N 122.6°E — 30W (Salome) crosses the Bondoc Peninsula after briefly emerging off the strait connecting Ragay Gulf to the Sibuyan Sea.
- 11:00 UTC (19:00 PHT) at 13.7°N 121.4°E — PAGASA reports 30W (Salome) makes its final landfall on San Juan, Batangas.
- 12:00 UTC (20:00 PHT) at 13.7°N 121.4°E — PAGASA upgrades 30W (Salome) to a tropical storm as it traverses Batangas.

November 10

- 00:00 UTC
  - At 15.0°N 119.2°E — The JMA designates 30W (Salome) as Haikui after the agency analyzes the system has intensified to a tropical storm.
  - At 15.2°N 119.2°E — The JTWC follows suit, upgrading Haikui (Salome) to a tropical storm after the system emerged over the South China Sea.
- 06:00 UTC (14:00 PHT) at 15.9°N 118.4°E — PAGASA assesses Haikui (Salome) has reached its within-PAR peak with 10-minute winds of 75 km/h (40 kn; 47 mph) and a central pressure of 995 hPa as it continues to move away from Luzon.
- 18:00 UTC
  - At 17.3°N 116.5°E — The JTWC analyzes Haikui (Salome) has peaked with 1-minute sustained winds of 45 kn (83 km/h; 52 mph) and a central pressure of 989 hPa as it turns west-northwestward.
  - (02:00 PHT, November 11) at 17.4°N 116.9°E — PAGASA reports Haikui (Salome) has left the PAR.

November 11

- 00:00 UTC at 17.6°N 116.2°E — The JMA also analyzes Haikui has reached its peak with 10-minute sustained winds of 40 kn (74 km/h; 46 mph) and a central pressure of 998 hPa as it gradually shifts to a westward movement.
- 18:00 UTC at 17.8°N 113.5°E — The JTWC downgrades Haikui to a tropical depression as it slowly trails westward.

November 12

- 06:00 UTC at 17.5°N 112.3°E — The JMA also downgrades Haikui to a tropical depression while the JTWC downgrades it further to a tropical disturbance as it moves closer to the southeast of Hainan.

November 13

- 00:00 UTC at 17.5°N 110.5°E — The JMA last notes Tropical Depression Haikui as it further weakens while located south of Hainan, dissipating six hours later.

November 16

- 12:00 UTC at 7.1°N 123.6°E — Another tropical depression forms over Moro Gulf.
- 18:00 UTC (02:00 PHT, November 17) at 7.8°N 122.3°E — The tropical depression formerly over Moro Gulf crosses the Zamboanga Peninsula.

November 17

- 00:00 UTC (08:00 PHT) at 8.8°N 120.5°E — After emerging over Sulu Sea, the tropical depression gets a local name Tino from the PAGASA. The agency analyzes the system having 10-minute winds of 55 km/h (30 kn; 34 mph) and a central pressure of 1002 hPa.
- 06:00 UTC at 9.3°N 119.3°E — The JTWC also starts tracking on Tino, designating it 31W as the system is about to cross Palawan.
- 09:00 UTC (17:00 PHT) at 9.7°N 118.7°E — Tropical Depression 31W (Tino) hits Puerto Princesa City, Palawan.
- 18:00 UTC at 10.8°N 116.2°E — The JTWC upgrades 31W (Tino) to a tropical storm as it is about to exit the PAR.

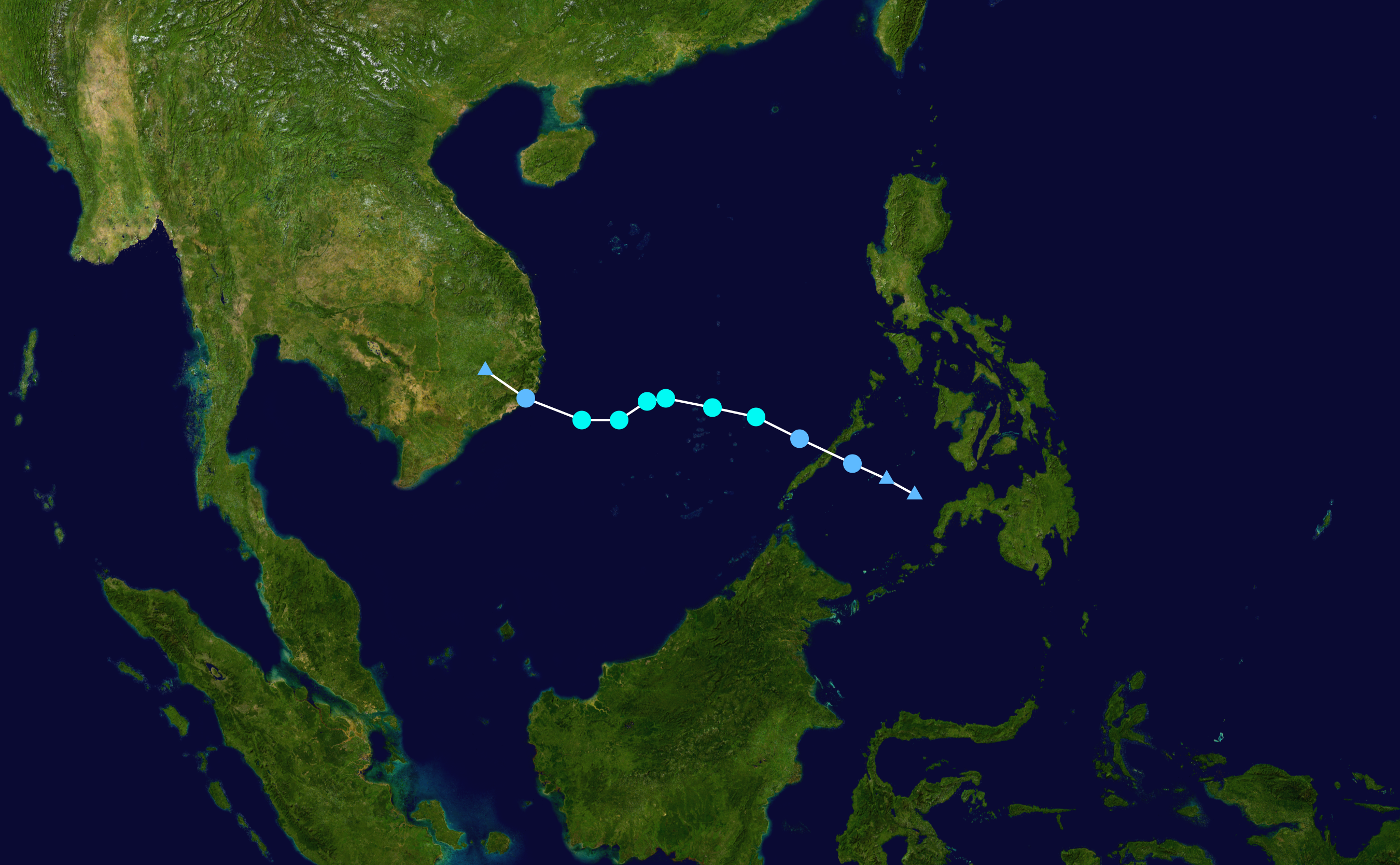
Track of Kirogi during mid-November.

November 18

- 00:00 UTC
  - At 11.5°N 115.2°E — The JMA upgrades 31W (Tino) to a tropical storm, naming it Kirogi as it traverses over the South China Sea. Subsequently, it also attains its peak with 10-minute sustained winds of 35 kn (65 km/h; 40 mph) and a central pressure of 1000 hPa.
  - (08:00 PHT) at 11.1°N 114.9°E — PAGASA reports Kirogi (Tino) has left the PAR as it intensifies to a tropical storm.
- 18:00 UTC at 10.7°N 111.8°E — The JTWC analyzes Kirogi has peaked with 1-minute sustained winds of 40 kn (74 km/h; 46 mph) and a central pressure of 993 hPa as it closes in on Vietnam.

November 19

- 00:00 UTC at 10.9°N 110.6°E — The JMA downgrades Kirogi to a tropical depression as it nears the Vietnamese coast.
- 06:00 UTC
  - At 11.0°N 109.6°E — The JMA last notes Kirogi as it degrades before striking land, dissipating six hours later.
  - At 11.4°N 108.8°E — The JTWC also downgrades Kirogi to a tropical depression.
- 06:00-09:00 UTC (13:00-16:00 ICT) at 12.0°N 109.2°E — Kirogi makes landfall on southern Vietnam.
- 12:00 UTC at 12.3°N 107.2°E — The JTWC also last notes Kirogi as it weakens to a weather disturbance while moving inland.

=== December ===
December 12

- 06:00 UTC (14:00 PHT) at 9.2°N 130.6°E — PAGASA reports the formation of Tropical Depression Urduja east of northeastern Mindanao.

December 13

- 18:00 UTC
  - At 10.8°N 126.8°E — The JMA starts classifying Urduja as a tropical depression.
  - At 11.3°N 128.3°E — The JTWC also starts tracking Urduja as a tropical depression, designating it 32W.

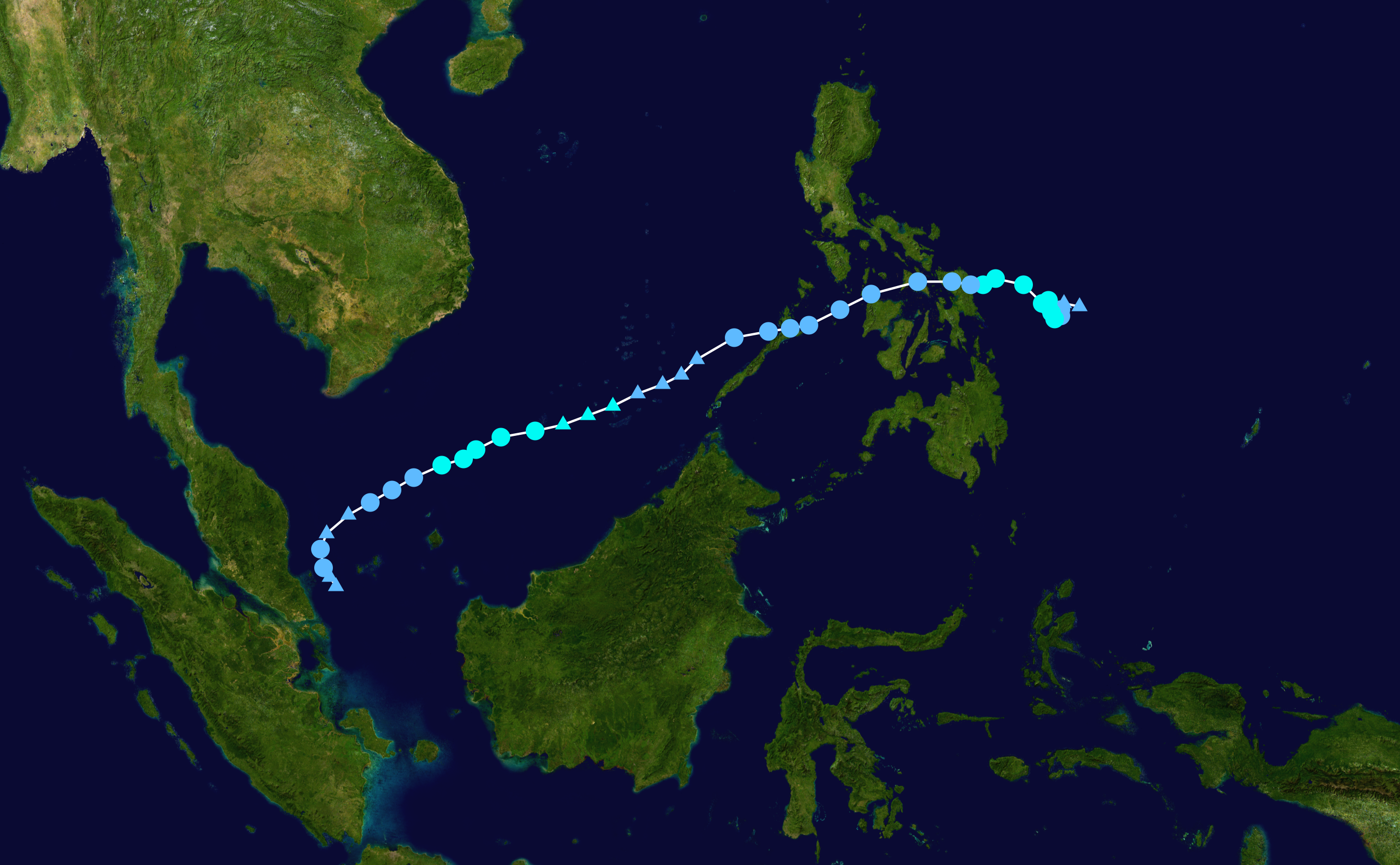
Erratic and unusual track of Kai-tak during mid to late December.

December 14

- 00:00 UTC at 11.0°N 127.4°E — Tropical Depression 32W (Urduja) intensifies to a tropical storm, with the JMA naming it Kai-tak as the system recurves to the east-northeast very slowly.
- 03:00 UTC (11:00 PHT) at 11.0°N 126.8°E — The PAGASA also follows suit, upgrading Kai-tak (Urduja) to a tropical storm.
- 06:00 UTC at 11.0°N 128.1°E — The JTWC also upgrades Kai-tak (Urduja) to a tropical storm.
- 12:00 UTC
  - At 11.3°N 128.2°E — The JMA analyzes Kai-tak (Urduja) has attained its initial peak 10-minute winds of 40 kn (74 km/h; 46 mph) as it continues to move very slowly while turning north.
  - At 11.2°N 128.0°E — The JTWC also assesses Kai-tak (Urduja) has attained its initial peak intensity with 1-minute winds of 50 kn (93 km/h; 58 mph) and a central pressure of 985 hPa.

December 15

- 06:00 UTC at 11.7°N 127.8°E — While maintaining its maximum 10-minute winds, Kai-tak (Urduja) deepens its central pressure to 994 hPa as the system slowly turns to the northwest.
- 18:00 UTC (02:00 PHT, December 16) at 11.9°N 127.3°E — PAGASA reports Kai-tak (Urduja) has peaked with 10-minute winds of 80 km/h (43 kn; 50 mph) and a central pressure of 993 hPa as it slowly moves westward towards Samar Island.

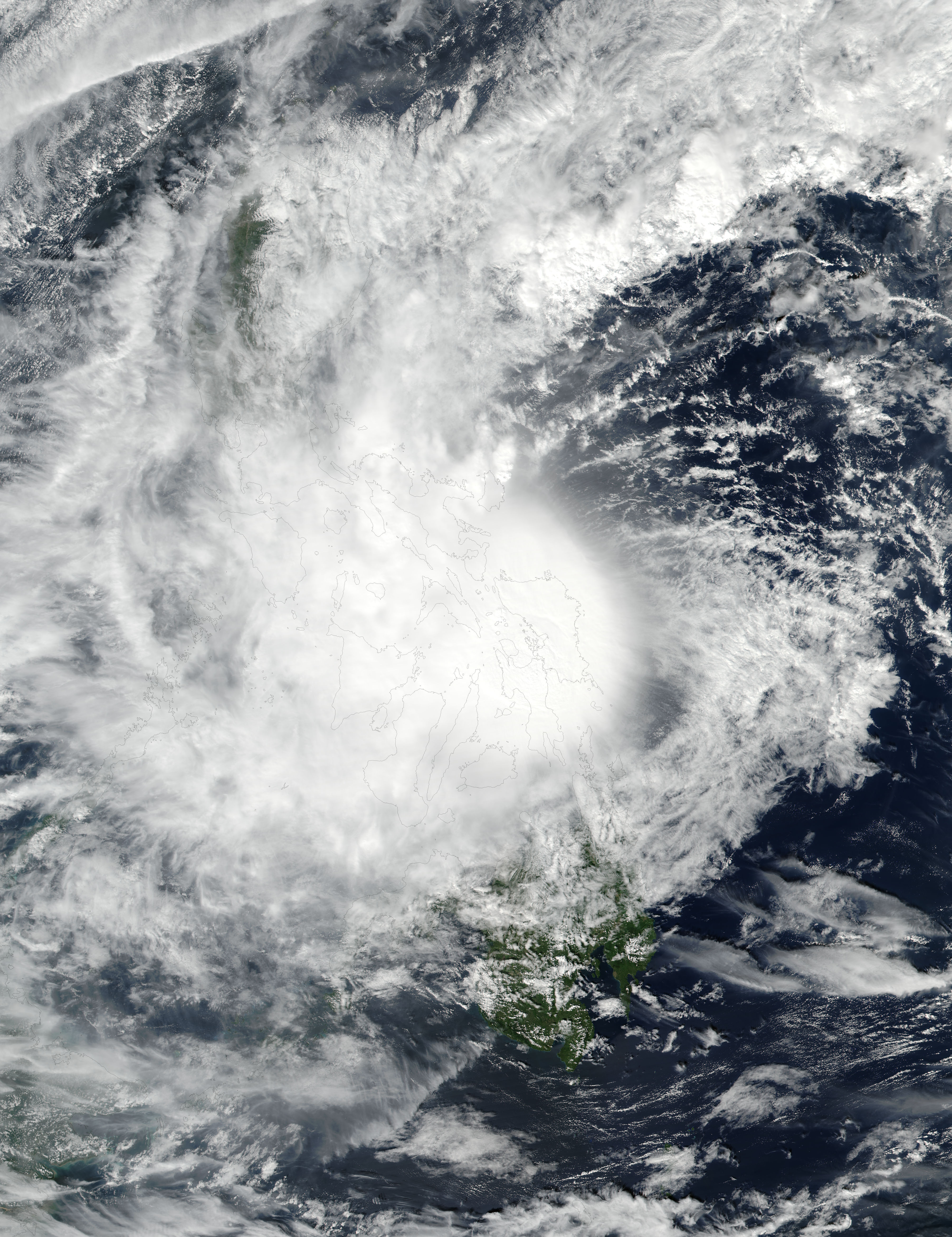
Kai-tak shortly before its landfall on Samar on December 16.

December 16

- 05:30 UTC (13:30 PHT) at 12.2°N 125.5°E — Tropical Storm Kai-tak (Urduja) finally hits land at San Policarpo, Eastern Samar.
- 12:00 UTC
  - At 12.2°N 125.6°E — The JMA downgrades Kai-tak (Urduja) to a tropical depression as it experiences frictional effects from land interaction.
  - At 4.6°N 146.4°E — Another tropical depression develops near the Caroline Islands.
  - At 12.1°N 125.4°E — The JTWC also downgrades Kai-tak (Urduja) to a tropical depression as it continues to traverse Samar Island slowly.
- 18:00 UTC at 4.6°N 146.1°E — The JMA analyzes the tropical depression near the Caroline Islands has attained its lowest pressure of 1004 hPa.
- 21:00 UTC (05:00 PHT, December 17) at 12.2°N 124.8°E — The PAGASA reports Kai-tak (Urduja) has weakened to a tropical depression as the system is about to emerge over the Samar Sea.

December 17

- 02:00 UTC (10:00 PHT) at 12.3°N 123.7°E — Tropical Depression Kai-tak (Urduja) makes its second landfall at Mobo, Masbate.
- 04:00 UTC (12:00 PHT) at 12.4°N 122.6°E — Briefly crossing Sibuyan Sea, Tropical Depression Kai-tak (Urduja) makes its third hit at Sibuyan Island, Romblon as the system turns to the southwest.
- 06:00 UTC at 5.2°N 145.7°E — The tropical depression near the Caroline Islands re-attains a central pressure of 1004 hPa after slightly rising earlier.
- 10:00 UTC (18:00 PHT) at 11.9°N 121.9°E — After re-emerging over Sibuyan Sea, Tropical Depression Kai-tak (Urduja) makes its fourth strike at Malay, Aklan.
- 12:00 UTC
  - At 5°N 146°E — The tropical depression near the Caroline Islands weakens to a remnant low.
  - At 11.3°N 121.2°E — The JTWC assesses Kai-tak (Urduja) has briefly regained some strength, now having 1-minute winds of 30 kn (56 km/h; 35 mph) and a central pressure of 1000 hPa as the system heads towards the Cuyo Archipelago.
- 15:00 UTC (23:00 PHT) at 10.9°N 121.0°E — Continuing to move towards the southwest, Tropical Depression Kai-tak (Urduja) crosses Cuyo, Palawan.
- 22:00 UTC (06:00 PHT, December 18) at 10.8°N 119.5°E — Tropical Depression Kai-tak (Urduja) makes its sixth and final landfall on Taytay, Palawan.

December 18

- 18:00 UTC at 9.7°N 116.6°E — The JTWC assesses Kai-tak (Urduja) has further degraded to a tropical wave over the South China Sea.

December 19

- 02:00 UTC (10:00 PHT) at 10.4°N 114.9°E — PAGASA reports Kai-tak (Urduja) has exited the PAR.

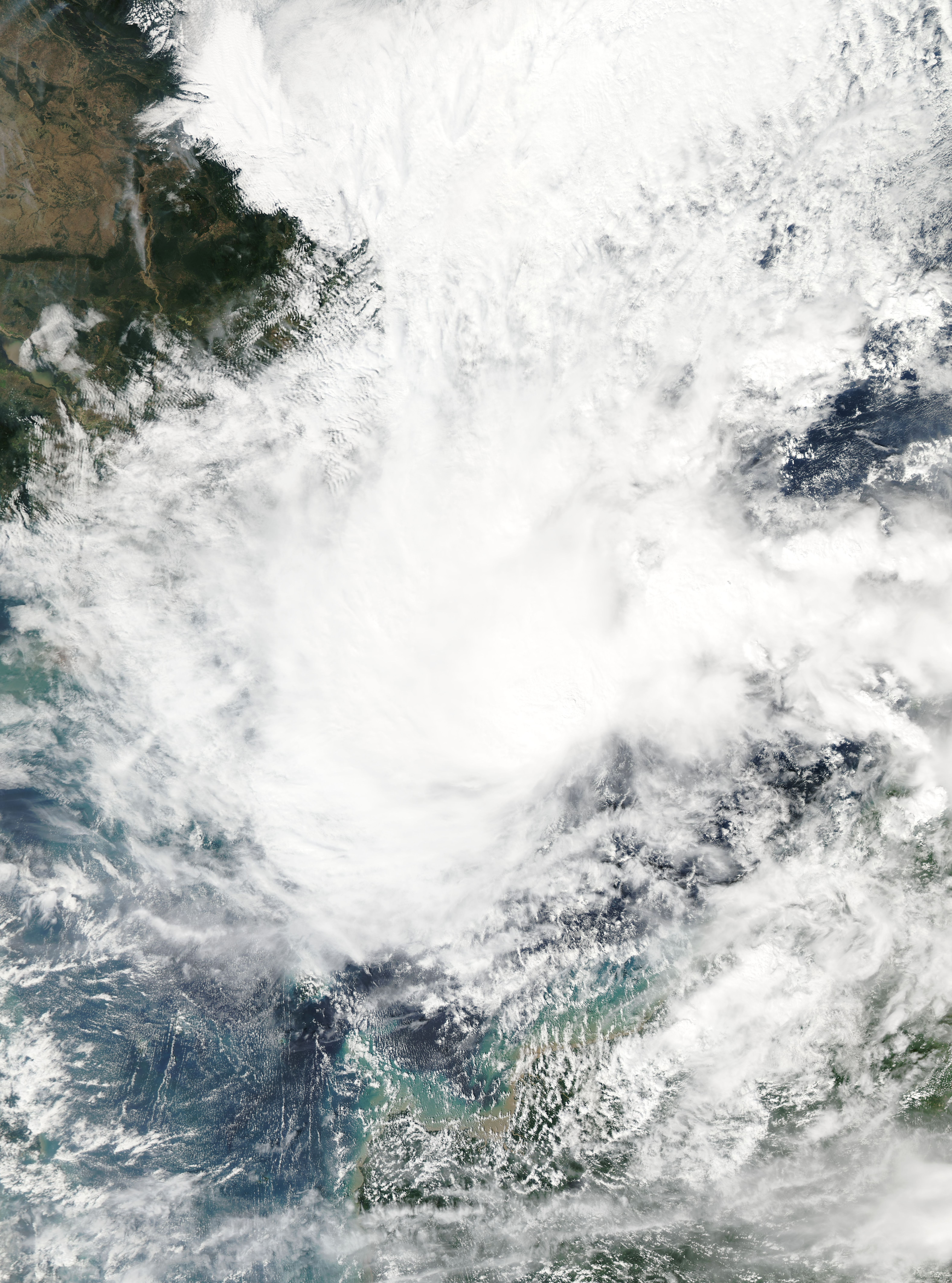
Kai-tak traversing southwestward over the South China Sea on December 20.

December 20

- 00:00 UTC
  - At 7.8°N 113.1°E — The JMA reports Kai-tak has regained strength to tropical storm status as it moves west-southwest.
  - At 8.1°N 134.2°E — The JMA reports the formation of another tropical depression north of Palau, possibly coming from the remnants of a former tropical depression near the Caroline Islands.
- 06:00 UTC (14:00 PHT) at 8.3°N 134.0°E — PAGASA names the tropical depression near Palau as Vinta.
- 12:00 UTC
  - At 7.3°N 111.7°E — The JMA analyzes Kai-tak has reached its secondary peak intensity with 10-minute winds of 40 kn (74 km/h; 46 mph) and a central pressure of 996 hPa.
  - At 7.4°N 111.4°E — The JTWC assesses Kai-tak has regained its tropical storm status.
  - At 7.8°N 132.4°E — The JTWC also starts tracking on Vinta, designating it 33W as it moves westwards towards Mindanao.
- 18:00 UTC
  - At 8.6°N 130.9°E — The JMA upgrades 33W (Vinta) to a tropical storm, naming it Tembin.
  - At 7.2°N 110.3°E — The JTWC assesses Kai-tak has re-strengthened to a 50 kn (93 km/h; 58 mph) tropical storm with a central pressure of 985 hPa.
  - (02:00 PHT, December 21) at 9.0°N 131.1°E — PAGASA follows suit, upgrading Tembin (Vinta) to a tropical storm as well.

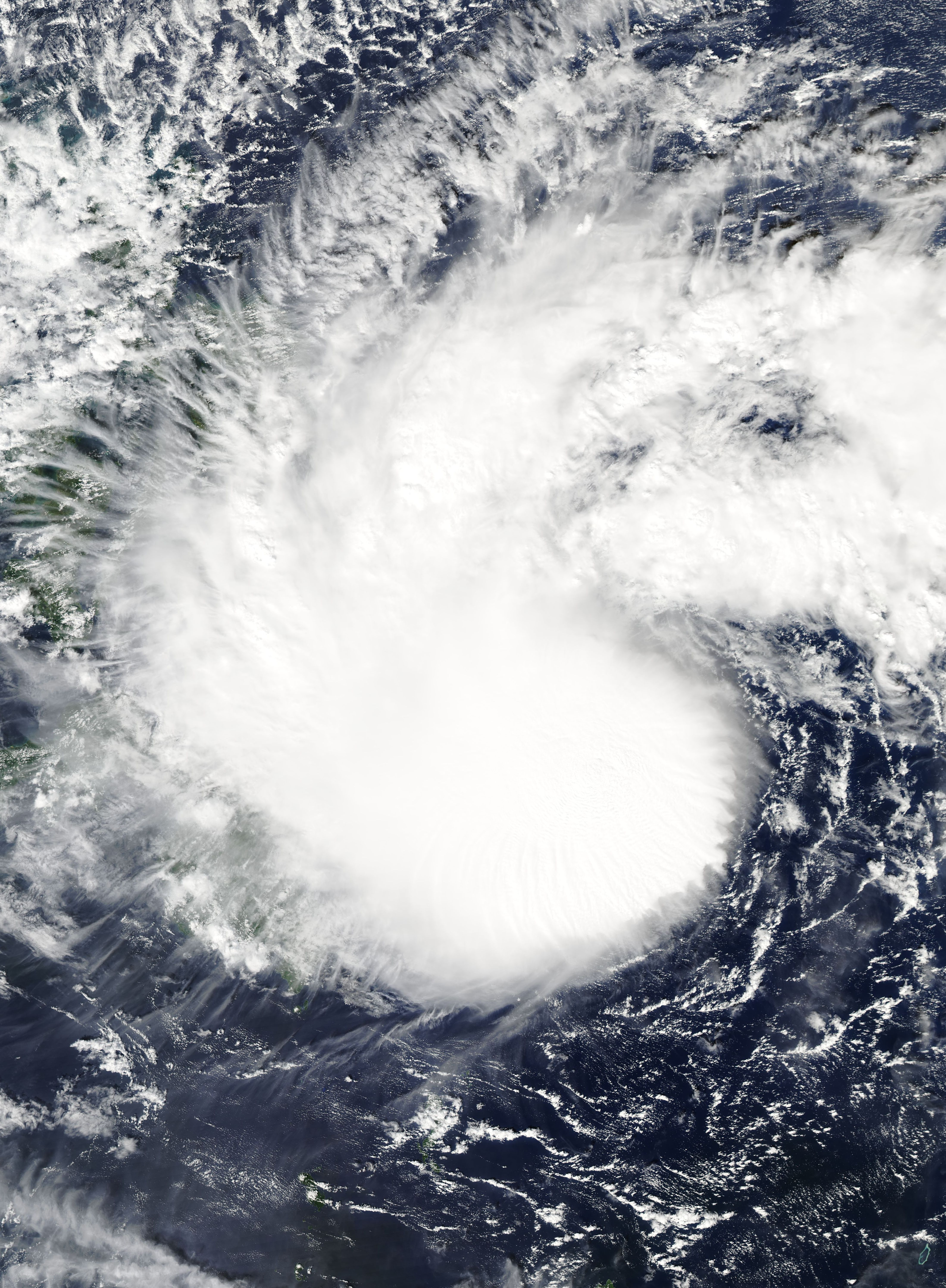
Tembin hours before landfall on Mindanao on December 21.

December 21

- 00:00 UTC at 8.5°N 129.8°E — The JTWC also upgrades Tembin (Vinta) to a tropical storm as it turns west-southwest.
- 12:00 UTC
  - At 6.3°N 108.5°E — Continuing to dive southwestwards, the JMA downgrades Kai-tak to a tropical depression.
  - (20:00 PHT) at 8.3°N 127.3°E — PAGASA reports Tembin (Vinta) has strengthened to a severe tropical storm with 10-minute winds of 90 km/h (49 kn; 56 mph) and a central pressure of 987 hPa as it is about to make landfall.
- 17:45 UTC (01:45 PHT, December 22) at 7.8°N 126.5°E — PAGASA reports Tembin (Vinta) has made landfall at Cateel, Davao Oriental.
- 18:00 UTC
  - At 7.8°N 126.8°E — The JMA analyzes Tembin (Vinta) has peaked initially with 10-minute sustained winds of 50 kn (93 km/h; 58 mph) and a central pressure of 990 hPa, making it a severe tropical storm.
  - At 7.9°N 126.5°E — The JTWC also analyzes Tembin (Vinta) as initially peaking with 1-minute winds of 50 kn (93 km/h; 58 mph) and a central pressure of 986 hPa.
  - At 5.9°N 107.5°E — The JTWC also follows suit, downgrading Kai-tak back to a tropical depression as it dives to a lower latitude, which is unusual for tropical cyclones.

December 22

- 00:00 UTC
  - At 7.7°N 125.2°E — Experiencing land interaction from traversing Mindanao, Tembin (Vinta) weakens to a tropical storm per JMA.
  - (08:00 PHT) at 7.8°N 125.6°E — PAGASA also downgrades Tembin (Vinta) to a tropical storm.
- 06:00 UTC (14:00 PHT) at 8.0°N 124.1°E — PAGASA further downgrades Tembin (Vinta) to a tropical depression now over the Zamboanga Peninsula.
- 12:00 UTC at 4.7°N 105.4°E — Now below 5th latitude, the JTWC downgrades Kai-tak to a tropical disturbance as it nears the Malay peninsula.
- 15:00 UTC (23:00 PHT) at 8.0°N 122.0°E — PAGASA reports Tembin (Vinta) has re-intensified to a tropical storm after emerging over the Sulu Sea.
- 18:00 UTC at 7.8°N 121.4°E — The JMA reports Tembin (Vinta) has re-strengthened back to being a severe tropical storm.

December 23

- 00:00 UTC at 3.6°N 104.5°E — Turning further south at lower latitudes, the JTWC assesses Kai-tak has re-intensified to a 25 kn (46 km/h; 29 mph) tropical depression with a central pressure of 1002 hPa.
- 06:00 UTC (14:00 PHT) at 7.6°N 119.0°E — PAGASA reports Tembin (Vinta) has further re-intensified to a severe tropical storm as it nears Palawan.
- 12:00 UTC
  - At 7.8°N 117.5°E — The JMA assesses Tembin (Vinta) has intensified further to a typhoon as it nears landfall in Palawan.
  - At 7.7°N 117.4°E — The JTWC also upgrades Tembin (Vinta) to a Category 1 typhoon.
  - At 2.7°N 104.8°E — The JTWC downgrades Kai-tak to a tropical disturbance once again east of Tioman Island.
- 14:00 UTC (22:00 PHT) at 7.8°N 117.1°E — Tembin (Vinta) makes its second landfall at Balabac, Palawan.
- 18:00 UTC
  - At 2.7°N 104.8°E — At an unsuitable latitude for tropical cyclones, the JMA last notes Tropical Depression Kai-tak with the system dissipating six hours later.
  - (02:00 PHT, December 24) at 8.0°N 115.8°E — After emerging over the South China Sea, PAGASA reports Tembin (Vinta) has intensified to a typhoon with 10-minute winds of 120 km/h (65 kn; 75 mph) and a central pressure of 973 hPa as it is about to exit the PAR.

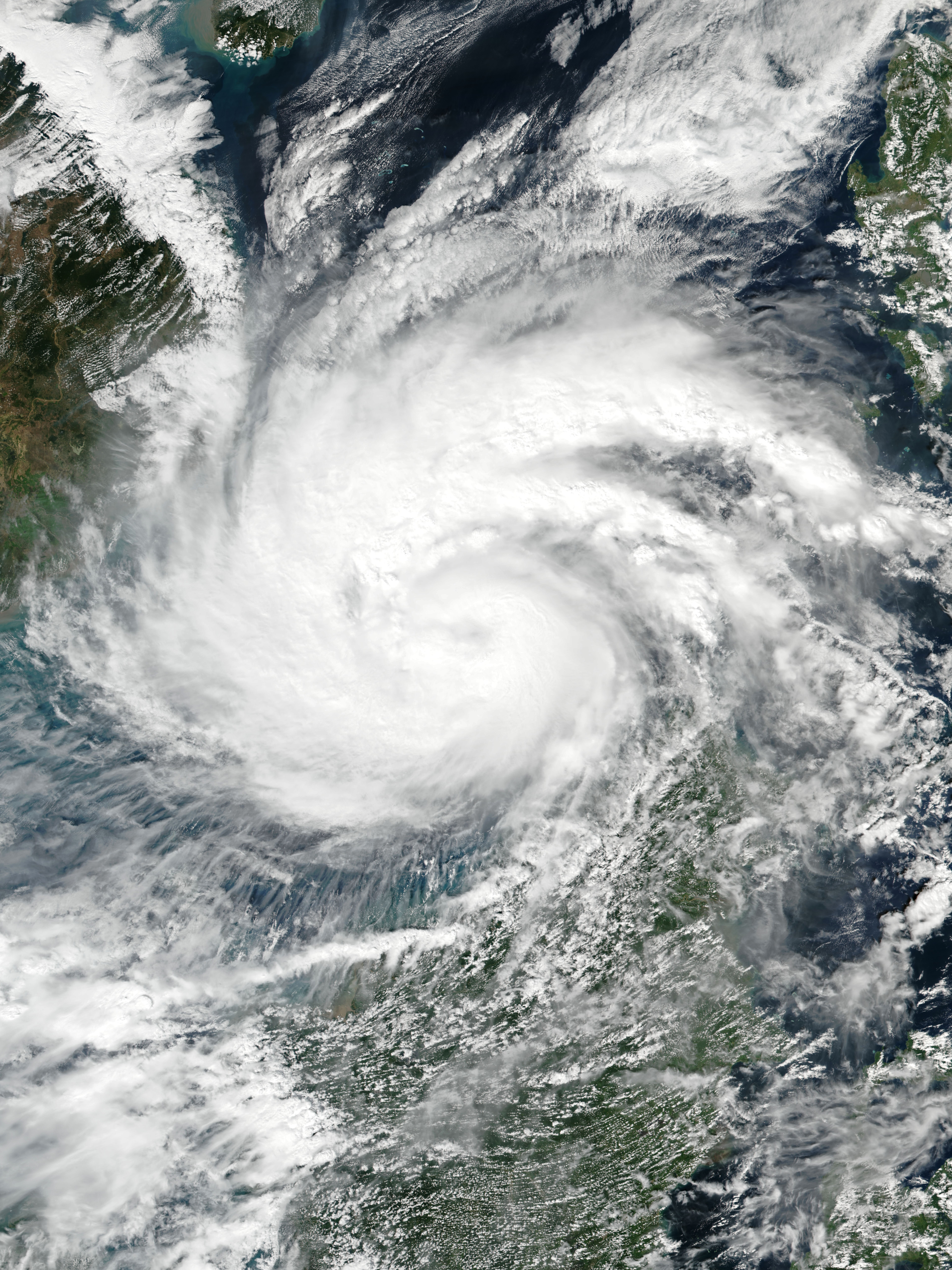
Tembin at its peak intensity over the South China Sea on December 24.

December 24

- 00:00 UTC
  - At 8.1°N 114.7°E — The JMA analyzes Tembin (Vinta) has attained its best peak as a typhoon with 10-minute sustained winds of 70 kn (130 km/h; 81 mph) and a central pressure of 975 hPa while moving westwards.
  - (08:00 PHT) at 8.5°N 114.9°E — PAGASA reports Tembin (Vinta) has left the PAR.
- 06:00 UTC at 8.2°N 113.2°E — The JTWC further upgrades Tembin to a Category 2 typhoon, subsequently peaking with 1-minute winds of 85 kn (157 km/h; 98 mph) and a central pressure of 959 hPa.
- 12:00 UTC at 8.3°N 111.9°E — The JTWC downgrades Tembin back to a Category 1 typhoon as it continues to traverse westwards.
- 18:00 UTC at 8.1°N 111.0°E — The JMA downgrades Tembin back to a severe tropical storm once again, now moving south of Vietnam.

December 25

- 00:00 UTC
  - At 8.0°N 109.9°E — The JMA further downgrades Tembin to a tropical storm.
  - At 7.9°N 109.8°E — The JTWC follows suit, downgrading Tembin back to a tropical storm.
- 12:00 UTC at 8.7°N 107.7°E — The JMA reports Tembin has further weakened to a tropical depression as it approaches Côn Đảo.
- 18:00 UTC at 8.4°N 106.1°E — The JTWC also downgrades Tembin to a tropical depression after making a close approach on Côn Đảo.

December 26

- 00:00 UTC at 8.4°N 105.0°E — Further degrading, the JTWC reports Tembin has weakened to a tropical disturbance near Hon Khoai.
- 06:00 UTC at 8.6°N 103.6°E — The JMA last notes Tembin south of Cambodia, with the system dissipating at 12:00 UTC.

December 29

- 18:00 UTC at 7.4°N 138.0°E — The JMA marks a tropical depression near the Caroline Islands.

December 30

- 06:00 UTC at 8.6°N 136.9°E — The JMA analyzes the tropical depression near the Caroline Islands has slightly deepened its central pressure to 1004 hPa.
- 18:00 UTC at 9.4°N 135.2°E — Now turning westward, the tropical depression near the Caroline Islands re-attains a central pressure of 1004 hPa before slightly rising again; the system becomes Tropical Storm Bolaven (Agaton) in the opening days of the 2018 Pacific typhoon season.

December 31

- 23:59 UTC — The 2017 Pacific typhoon season ends.
