= Tropical Depression 26W (2017) =

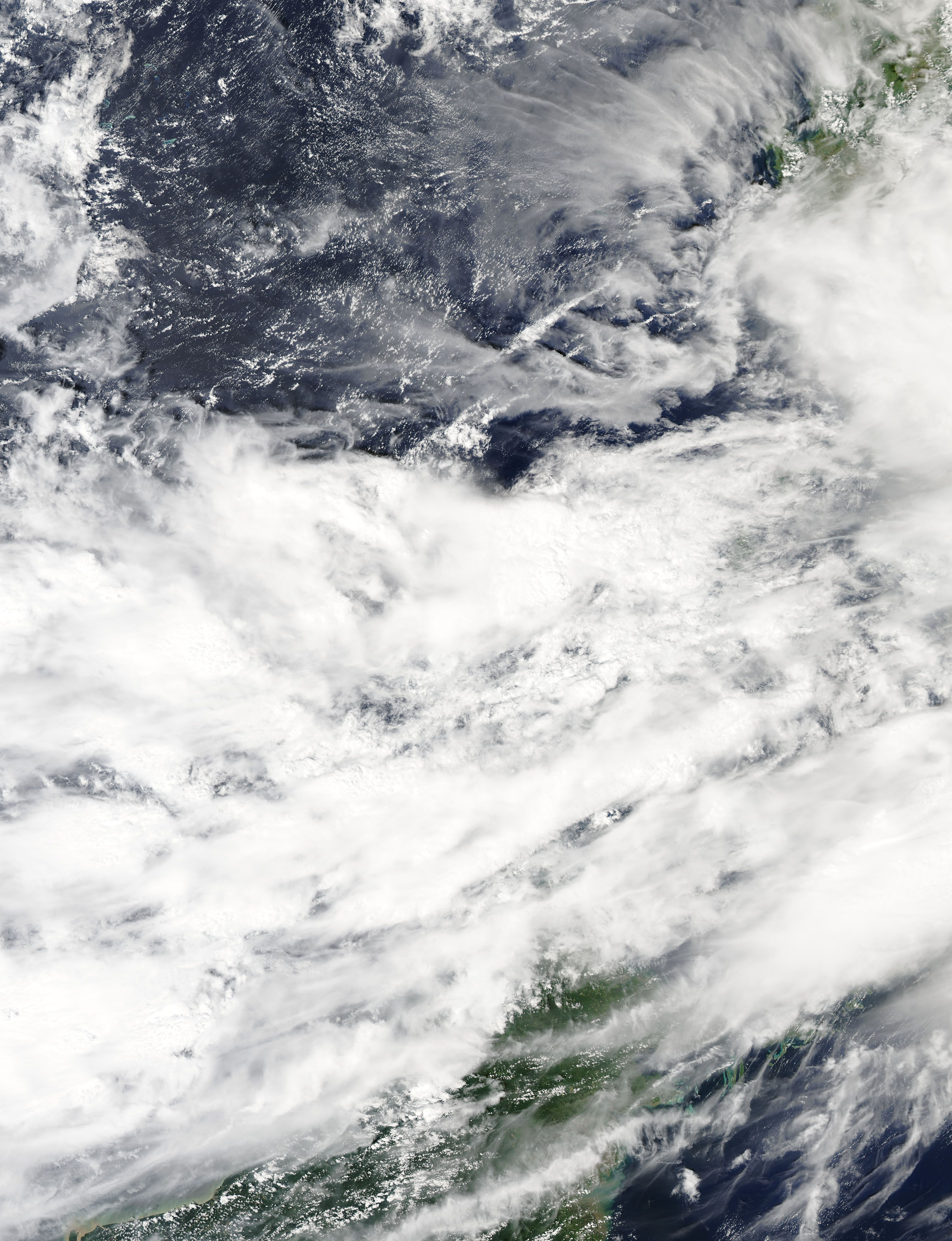
- Tropical Depression 26W west of Palawan on October 19

Meteorological history
- Formed: October 18, 2019
- Dissipated: October 19, 2019

Tropical depression
- 1-minute sustained (SSHWS/JTWC)
- Highest winds: 45 km/h (30 mph)
- Lowest pressure: 1002 hPa (mbar); 29.59 inHg

Overall effects
- Fatalities: 18 total
- Damage: $4.83 million (2017 USD)
- Areas affected: Philippines
- IBTrACS
- Part of the 2017 Pacific typhoon season

Tropical Depression 26W was a weak and short-lived tropical cyclone which caused flooding and landslides in the Philippines in October 2017. The system originated from a monsoon trough over the South China Sea on October 18. It tracked east-northeast and became Tropical Depression 26W later that day. 26W soon weakened due to increasing wind shear. On the next day, 26W was being absorbed by Typhoon Lan nearby.

Although 26W didn't directly impacted the Philippines, it interacted with the outer bands of Typhoon Lan and an ITCZ and brought rainfall to Mindanao and the Visayas. Flooding and landslides were reported in numerous provinces. The rains killed 18 people and resulted in a loss of about PhP248 million (US$4.83 million) across the country. (Note: Although some news claimed that the deaths and damages were caused by Lan (known locally as Paolo), the annual report from PAGASA stated that Lan didn't cause any impacts to the Philippines. Therefore, it can be assumed that all deaths and damages were caused by the interaction between 26W and an ITCZ.) 26W also produced high waves which affected the Zamboanga Peninsula and the Sulu archipelago, but only caused minor damage.

== Meteorological history ==
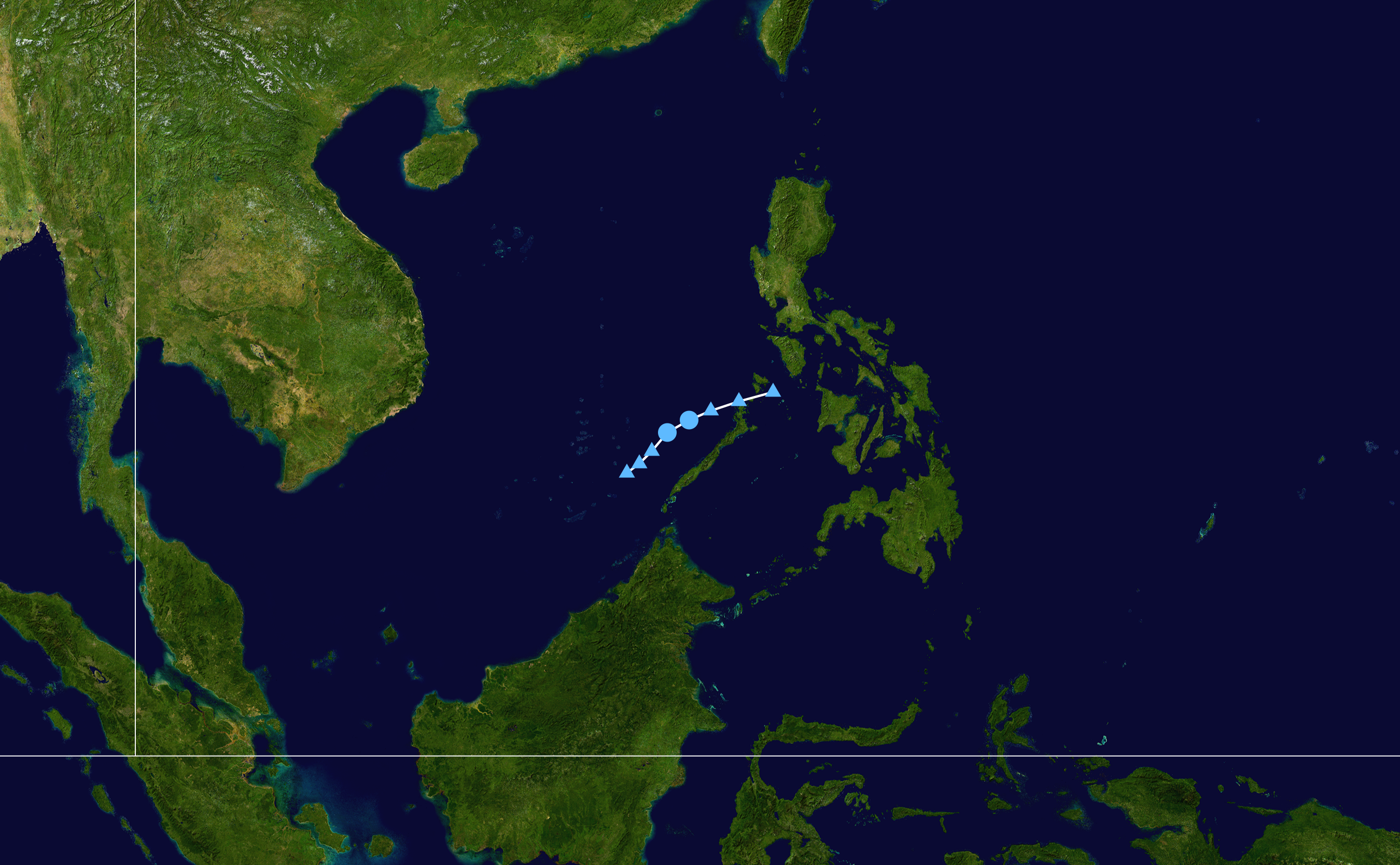
Map plotting the storm's track and intensity, according to the Saffir–Simpson scale Map key Saffir–Simpson scale Tropical depression (≤38 mph, ≤62 km/h) Tropical storm (39–73 mph, 63–118 km/h) Category 1 (74–95 mph, 119–153 km/h) Category 2 (96–110 mph, 154–177 km/h) Category 3 (111–129 mph, 178–208 km/h) Category 4 (130–156 mph, 209–251 km/h) Category 5 (≥157 mph, ≥252 km/h) Unknown Storm type Tropical cyclone Subtropical cyclone Extratropical cyclone, remnant low, tropical disturbance, or monsoon depression

On October 17, the Joint Typhoon Warning Center (JTWC) noted a tropical disturbance formed west of Palawan. On the next day, the organization improved, and the JTWC issued a Tropical Cyclone Formation Alert (TCFA) for the system. As deep convection began to wrap into the center, the JTWC upgraded the system to a tropical depression and assigned it as 26W. Although benefited from low wind shear and warm sea surface temperature of 30 °C (86 °F), weak equatorward outflow limited its intensification. It tracked east-northeast along a ridge to its southeast. Soon afterwards, wind shear increased and the center was completely exposed. Deep convection was sheared to the northwest. On October 19, the JTWC issued its final warning, as 26W was being absorbed by Typhoon Lan nearby.

== Impact ==
26W interacted with the outer bands of Typhoon Lan (known locally as Paolo) and a ITCZ and brought rainfall to Mindanao. Heavy rains caused flash floods and landslides to Zamboanga Peninsula, which killed 15 people. Over 3,000 families in Zamboanga City were displaced by the floods. School classes in the city were suspended due to heavy rains. 26W also triggered storm surge in Zamboanga City and destroyed over 200 houses in coastal areas. Damage in the city reached PhP176 million (US$3.44 million). Due to the huge impacts of the flooding, Zamboanga City declared a state of calamity on October 19.

In Carmen, Cotabato, a boat was capsized and five people fell into a river. Two of them were unable to escape and later found dead. In Pikit, seven people were injured by a traffic accident. In Cotabato City, an ambulance carrying two injured marines were overturned. One of the marines were dead before being hospitalized, while two people on the ambulanece were also injured. In Jabonga, Agusan del Norte, heavy rains caused landslides and destroyed three houses. In Buldon, Maguindanao, floodwaters overflew a bridge and trapped a car. 15,963 families were affected by the flood in the province. 26W also generated high waves in Sulu and Tawi-Tawi, which affected 3,410 people. The waves damaged 30 houses in Maimbung.

Apart from Mindanao, 26W also brought heavy rains in Negros Island. At least four villages in Negros Oriental were affected by flooding and landslides, and 87 families were evacuated. Roads were blocked and damaged by rocks, which interrupted land transport. Power outages were reported in the province. Another 1,000 people in Dumaguete were evacuated. School classes in Negros Oriental were suspended. People in Valencia were trapped by landslides, and they were rescued later. The government stated that the damage was worse than Washi in 2011, though no casualties were reported across the province. Dumaguete and Valencia were declared a state of calamity after the floods. The nearby Negros Occidental was also affected by floods. 1,982.3 ha (4,898 acres) of farmland were flooded. 1,601 farmers were affected, and the loss in agriculture amounted to PhP50 million (US$970,000). Two landslides occurred in Puerto Princesa, Palawan but no casualties were reported. In Magsaysay, Occidental Mindoro, despite floodwaters was only 0.2 m (0.66 ft) depth, it still damaged 955.5 ha (2,361 acres) of crops and incurred a loss of PhP21.6 million (US$420,000).

== See also ==
- Weather of 2017
- Tropical cyclones in 2017
- Tropical Storm Linfa (2003)
- Typhoon Hagibis (2007)
- Typhoon Chan-hom (2009)
