= Tropical Storm Kirogi (2017) =

Pacific tropical storm in 2017

Tropical Storm Kirogi (Tino)
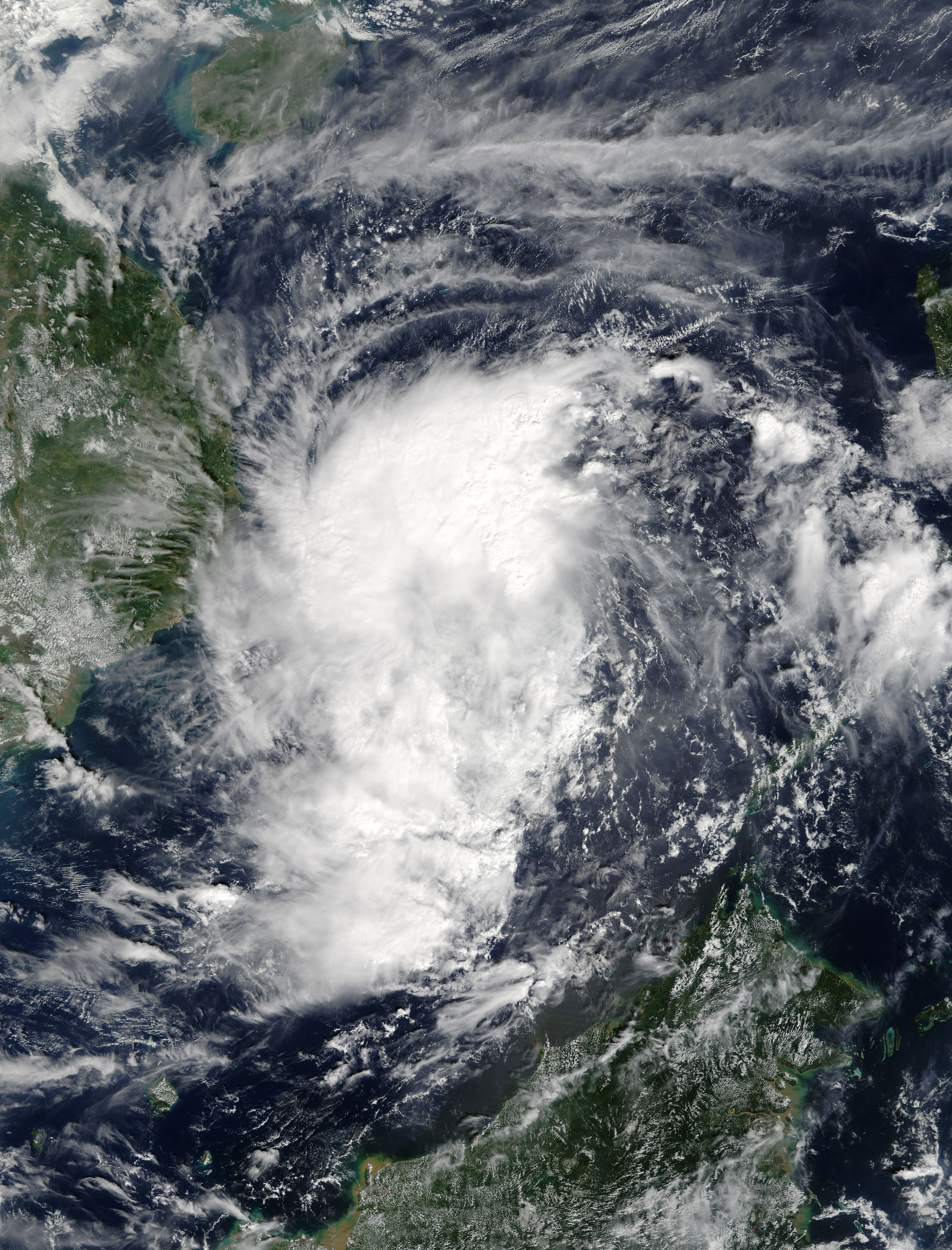
- Kirogi at peak intensity on November 18

Meteorological history
- Formed: November 16, 2017
- Dissipated: November 19, 2017

Tropical storm
- 10-minute sustained (JMA)
- Highest winds: 65 km/h (40 mph)
- Lowest pressure: 1000 hPa (mbar); 29.53 inHg

Tropical storm
- 1-minute sustained (SSHWS/JTWC)
- Highest winds: 75 km/h (45 mph)
- Lowest pressure: 993 hPa (mbar); 29.32 inHg

Overall effects
- Fatalities: 8 total
- Damage: Minimal
- Areas affected: Philippines, Vietnam
- IBTrACS
- Part of the 2017 Pacific typhoon season

Tropical Storm Kirogi, known in the Philippines as Tropical Storm Tino, was a weak tropical cyclone that affected the Philippines and Vietnam in mid-November 2017. The thirty-ninth tropical depression, twenty-fifth tropical storm, and fourteenth system to affect Vietnam in the 2017 Pacific typhoon season, Kirogi formed as a tropical depression on November 16 in the Moro Gulf. After being given the local name Tino by the PAGASA, it entered the South China Sea, intensifying into a tropical storm and receiving the name Kirogi from the Japan Meteorological Agency on November 18. Continuing westwards, it weakened into a tropical depression before making landfall near Cam Ranh Bay in Vietnam on the next day, dissipating shortly afterwards. Kirogi's remnants later contributed to the formation of Cyclone Ockhi.

Kirogi caused flooding in the Philippines and Vietnam, with trees and power poles toppling in Ho Chi Minh City. Eight people were killed in Vietnam.

== Meteorological history ==
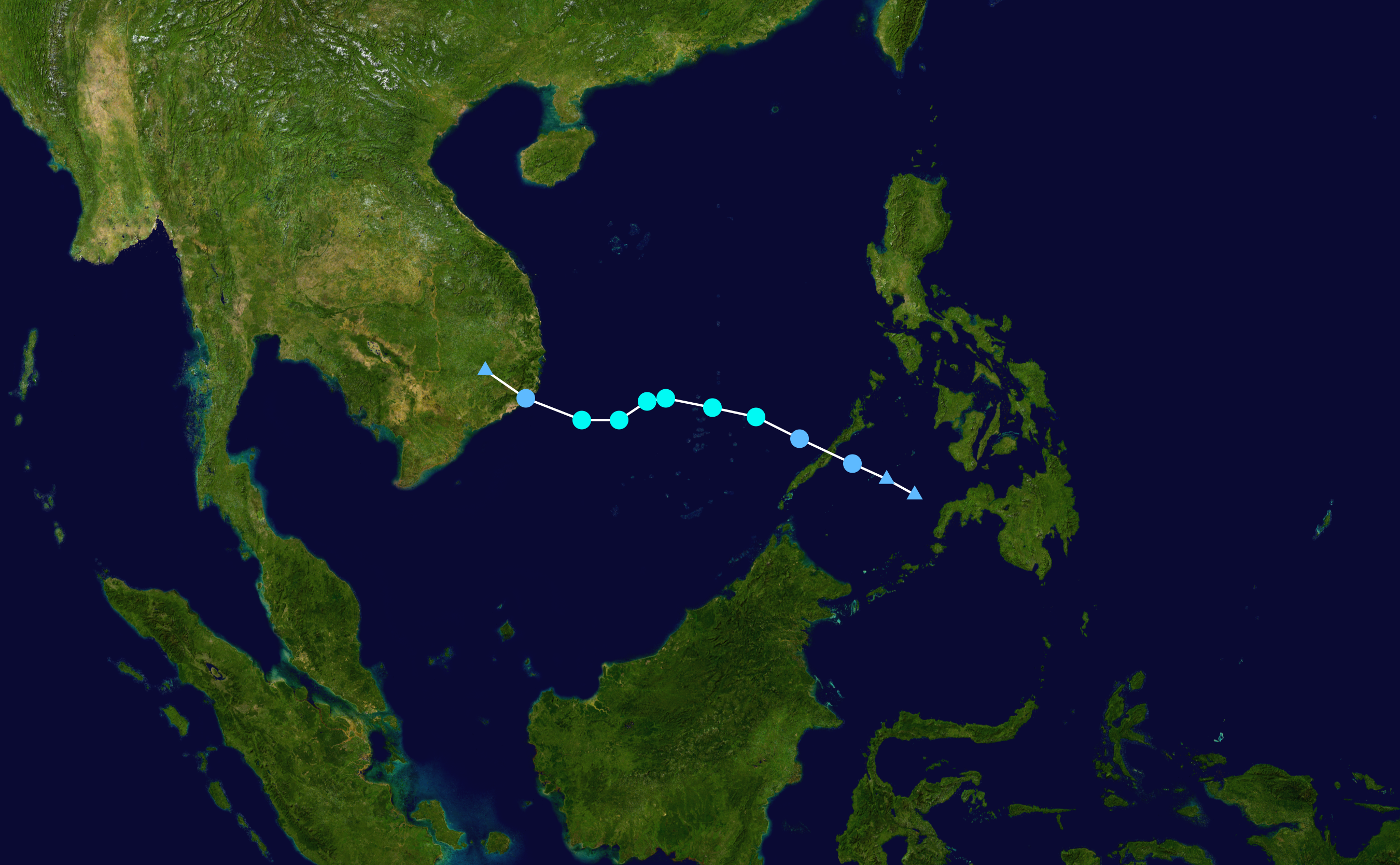
Map plotting the storm's track and intensity, according to the Saffir–Simpson scale Map key Saffir–Simpson scale Tropical depression (≤38 mph, ≤62 km/h) Tropical storm (39–73 mph, 63–118 km/h) Category 1 (74–95 mph, 119–153 km/h) Category 2 (96–110 mph, 154–177 km/h) Category 3 (111–129 mph, 178–208 km/h) Category 4 (130–156 mph, 209–251 km/h) Category 5 (≥157 mph, ≥252 km/h) Unknown Storm type Tropical cyclone Subtropical cyclone Extratropical cyclone, remnant low, tropical disturbance, or monsoon depression

On November 15 at 15:00 Coordinated Universal Time (UTC), the Joint Typhoon Warning Center (JTWC) began monitoring an area of convection approximately 355 nautical miles (655 km; 410 mi) east-southeast of Mindanao for potential development, estimating its development chances within the next day as low. The system was disorganized, with an exposed and ill-defined low-level circulation. The system moved over more favorable conditions for development as the low-level circulation began to consolidate, and at 20:00 UTC, the JTWC upgraded the system's development chances within the next day to medium. On November 16 at 12:00 UTC, the Japan Meteorological Agency (JMA) assessed that a tropical depression had formed over the Moro Gulf, and at 21:00 UTC, the JTWC issued a Tropical Cyclone Formation Alert for the system. On November 17 at 02:00 UTC, the PAGASA assessed that the system developed into a tropical depression, assigning it the local name Tino. Four hours later at 06:00 UTC, the JTWC assessed that Tino had developed into a tropical depression, assigning it the designation 31W. At 09:00 UTC, Tino made landfall on Puerto Princesa before entering into the South China Sea. Tino entered the South China Sea as a disorganized system, with a weak low-level circulation and shallow convective bands. Conditions in the area were relatively favorable, with sea surface temperatures of 30 °C (86 °F), favorable outflow, and vertical wind shear at 15–20 knots (30–35 km/h; 15–25 mph) which was partially negated by the system's motion; development was partly limited due to northeasterly dry air.

The JTWC upgraded Tino to a tropical storm at 18:00 UTC as the system's low-level circulation became partially exposed; the JMA followed on November 18 at 00:00 UTC, assigning it the international name Kirogi. (Note: The name Kirogi (Korean: 기러기, [kiɾɔɡi]) was contributed by North Korea and refers to a wild goose in Korean.) The JMA estimated that Kirogi peaked in intensity at the same time, with maximum sustained winds of 65 km/h (40 mph) and a minimum central pressure of 1000 hPa (mbar; 29.53 inHg). At 02:00 UTC, Kirogi left the Philippine Area of Responsibility as its convection became displaced towards the west and northwest. At 18:00 UTC, the JTWC estimated maximum 1-minute sustained winds of 75 km/h (45 mph); convection began to fragment and collapse during the surrounding hours as an anticyclone continued to displace the convection, hindering the system's development. On November 19 at 00:00 UTC, the JMA downgraded Kirogi to a tropical depression, before making landfall south-southwest of Cam Ranh Bay and being downgraded to a tropical depression by the JTWC at 06:00 UTC. Kirogi was downgraded to a disturbance by the JTWC at 12:00 UTC, with the JMA estimating the system to have dissipated. Kirogi's remnants would later move into the Gulf of Thailand on November 20 and into the Andaman Sea on November 21, later contributing to the formation of Cyclone Ockhi.

== Preparations and impact ==
=== Philippines ===
Signal #1 warnings were raised for the province of Palawan by the PAGASA on November 17 at 03:00 UTC. Warnings remained for Palawan until later that day at 15:00 UTC. The PAGASA advised against sea travel due to rough seas, also warning residents of the possibility of landslides and flooding. In Davao City, several families evacuated due to flooding. Over 200 people in Taytay, Palawan, San Vicente, Palawan, and Roxas, Palawan were evacuated. On November 17, Culion and Puerto Princesa suspended classes for the day. Almost 100 people were evacuated in Mansalay, Oriental Mindoro. Bad weather prompted the cancellation of five domestic flights.

Several barangays in Mansalay were affected by floodwaters 0.5–1 meter (1.6–3.3 ft) deep; San Vicente received floods 1 metre (3.3 ft) deep. Three houses were damaged in Palawan; ports in Puerto Princesa, Coron, Palawan, Cuyo, Palawan, El Nido, Palawan, and Brooke's Point temporarily suspended operations, stranding 243 passengers. A total of 497 people were affected as a result of the storm.

=== Vietnam ===
The National Center for Hydro-Meteorological Forecasting issued emergency warnings for Bình Thuận Province, Khánh Hòa Province, and Ninh Thuận Province from November 18–19. Ninh Thuận ordered fishing boats to anchor in storm shelters before the end of November 18. By the next day, more than 2,600 boats entered storm shelters, with 535 others at sea also having been reported to have sought shelter. Five households in Thuận Bắc District were evacuated; residents and tourists were advised and warned to move away from areas close to the shore. Flood warnings were issued for rivers in Bình Thuận, Central Highlands, Đồng Nai Province, and Hà Tĩnh Province from November 19–24. People living in vulnerable areas were evacuated, with local authorities making plans for reinforcing structures and further evacuations.

Trees in Ho Chi Minh City were uprooted due to strong winds, with several streets experiencing 300 millimetres (12 in) of flooding. Roofs were also blown off of houses in the city, with fallen power poles causing power outages. Flooding on National Route 50 reached depths of 1 metre (3.3 ft). 8,289 buildings were flooded, of which 7,966 were in Thừa Thiên Huế Province and 323 were in Quảng Trị Province. Several hundred meters of embankments for the Hiếu River were damaged by flooding in Cam Lộ. Water was released from reservoirs in Central Vietnam and the Central Highlands due to high water levels. In Mỹ Chánh, Quảng Trị, a reported 300 millimetres (12 in) of rain fell within 24 hours. 182 millimetres (7.2 in) of rain was reported in Qui Nhơn, with Huế reporting 142 millimetres (5.6 in) of rain. 517 hectares (1,280 acres) of rice and 60 hectares (150 acres) of other crops were damaged. Eight fatalities were reported by the Vietnam Disaster Management Authority.

=== Elsewhere ===
On November 19 in Ko Kut, 82.4 millimetres (3.24 in) of rainfall was recorded in 24 hours. The Thai Meteorological Department advised residents of the possibility of flash floods, strong winds, and storm surge, also cautioning ships of waves forecasted to reach 2 meters (6.6 ft).

== See also ==
- Weather of 2017
- Tropical cyclones in 2017
- Typhoon Damrey (2017) – a tropical cyclone that affected similar areas weeks earlier
