= Tropical cyclones in 2017 =

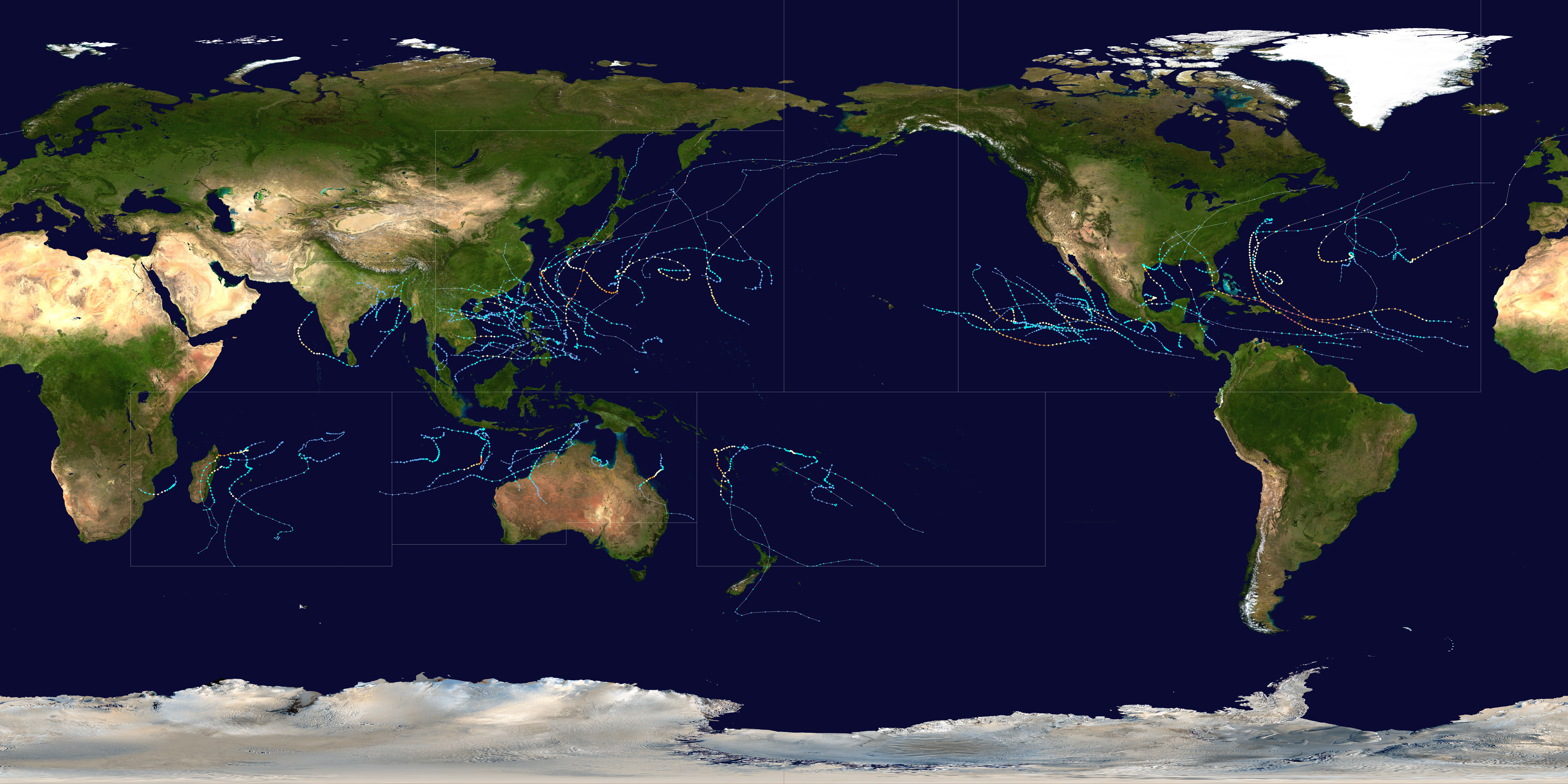
- Year summary map

Year boundaries
- First system: 06F
- Formed: January 2, 2017
- Last system: Ava
- Dissipated: January 9, 2018

Strongest system
- Name: Maria (Note: The "strength" of a tropical cyclone is measured by the minimum barometric pressure, not wind speed. Most meteorological organizations rate the intensity of a storm by this figure, so the lower the minimum pressure of the storm, the more intense or "stronger" it is considered to be. The strongest winds were actually from Irma, at 180 mph (285 km/h).)
- Lowest pressure: 908 mbar (hPa); 26.81 inHg

Longest lasting system
- Name: 19F & Noru
- Duration: 20 days

Year statistics
- Total systems: 146
- Named systems: 88
- Total fatalities: 5,645 total
- Total damage: $321.44 billion (2017 USD) (Costliest tropical cyclone year on record)
Related articles
- 2017 Atlantic hurricane season
- 2017 Pacific hurricane season
- 2017 Pacific typhoon season
- 2017 North Indian Ocean cyclone season
- 2016–17 South-West Indian Ocean cyclone season
- 2017–18 South-West Indian Ocean cyclone season
- 2016–17 Australian region cyclone season
- 2017–18 Australian region cyclone season
- 2016–17 South Pacific cyclone season
- 2017–18 South Pacific cyclone season

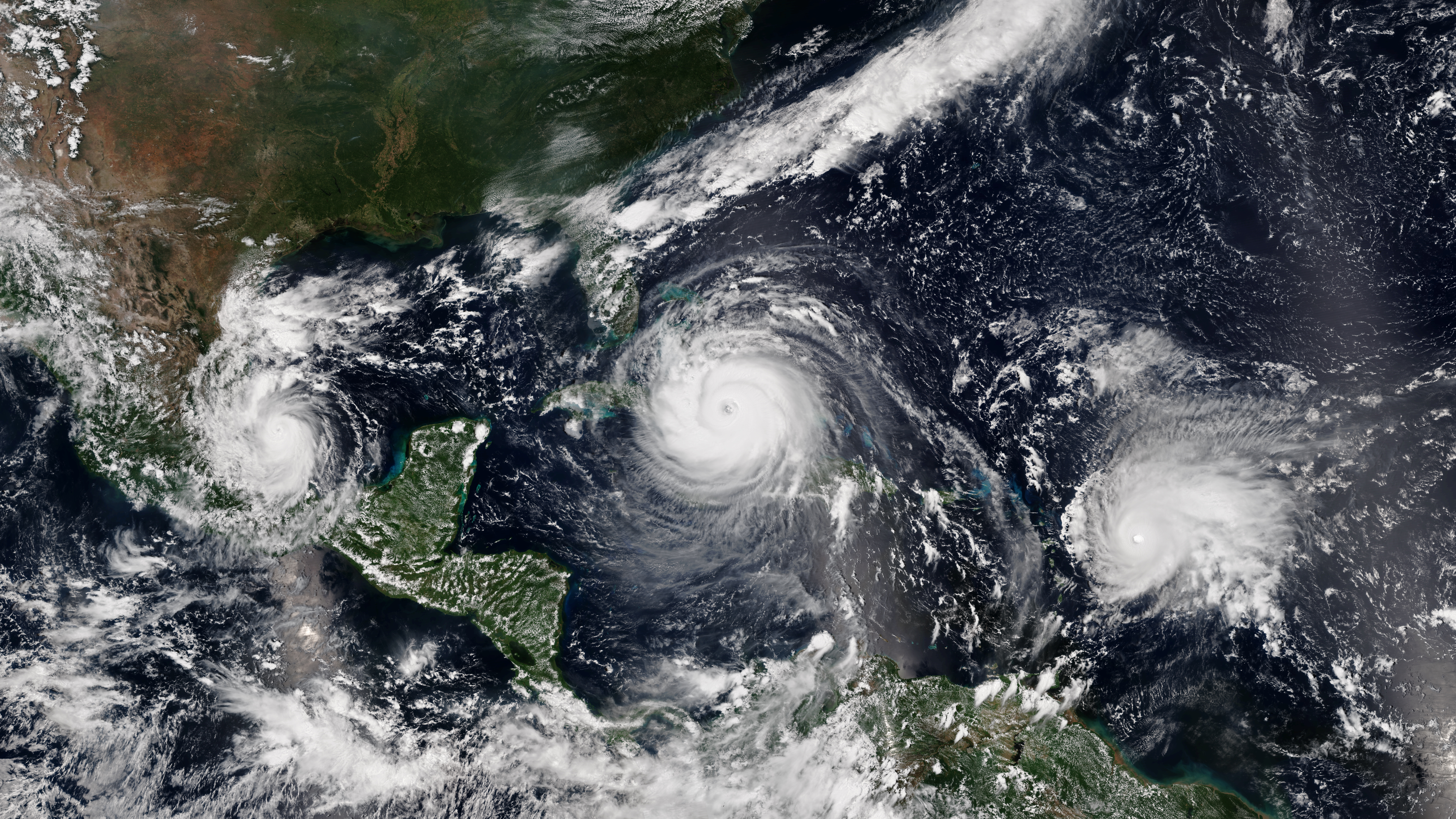
Three simultaneous hurricanes active on September 8, 2017 – with Katia (left), Irma (center), and Jose (right). All three were threatening land at the time.

Taken by various of satellites throughout 2017, these are the 19 tropical cyclones that reached at least Category 3 on the Saffir-Simpson scale during that year, from Enawo in March to Lan in October (though Debbie is out of order). Among them, Maria (fourth image in the third row) was the most intense with a minimum central pressure of 908 hPa.

During 2017 tropical cyclones formed within seven different tropical cyclone basins, located within various parts of the Atlantic, Pacific and Indian Oceans. During the year, a total of 146 tropical cyclones had formed. 88 tropical cyclones had been named by either a Regional Specialized Meteorological Center (RSMC) or a Tropical Cyclone Warning Center (TCWC). The strongest and deadliest tropical cyclone was Hurricane Maria with a minimum barometric pressure of 908 mbar (hPa; 26.81 inHg) and killing 3,000 people in Puerto Rico and Dominica. The costliest tropical cyclone of the year was Hurricane Harvey in the Atlantic, which struck Houston metropolitan area in August causing US$125 billion in damage, tying with Hurricane Katrina as the costliest tropical cyclone worldwide.

The most active basin in the year was the Western Pacific, which documented 27 named systems. However, the season had slightly below-average activity, and was the first season since 1977 to feature zero Category 5-equivalent super typhoons forming in the basin. The Eastern Pacific, despite amounting to 18 named systems, which constitutes above-average activity, was also significantly less active than the previous three Pacific hurricane seasons (2014, 2015 and 2016). However, the North Atlantic featured 17 named storms, and was the costliest tropical cyclone season on record. It also had the fifth-most named storms since reliable records began in 1851 – tied with 1936 – and the most major hurricanes since 2005. Activity across the southern hemisphere's three basins—South-West Indian, Australian, and South Pacific—was spread evenly, with each region recording seven named storms apiece, and with the most powerful cyclone, Cyclone Ernie, explosively intensifying to a Category 5 tropical cyclone. Two other Category 5 tropical cyclones formed in the North Atlantic, totalling to three Category 5 tropical cyclones that formed during the year. The accumulated cyclone energy (ACE) index for the 2017 (seven basins combined), as calculated by Colorado State University (CSU) was 621.1 units, which was below the 1981-2010 mean of 770.2 units.

== Global atmospheric and hydrological conditions ==
For the majority of the year, the tropics were dominated by neutral El Niño–Southern Oscillation (ENSO) conditions, before La Niña conditions set in later in the year. As the year opened, sea surface temperatures anomalies across the central and east-central equatorial Pacific were cooler than average, while the impacts of La Niña lingered within the atmospheric circulation, following an abrupt end to the 2016 La Niña episode. Over the next few months, these anomalies warmed and nearly reached the thresholds needed for an El Niño event to be declared, however, they subsequently cooled throughout the rest of the year and the 2017–18 La Niña event was declared to be underway.

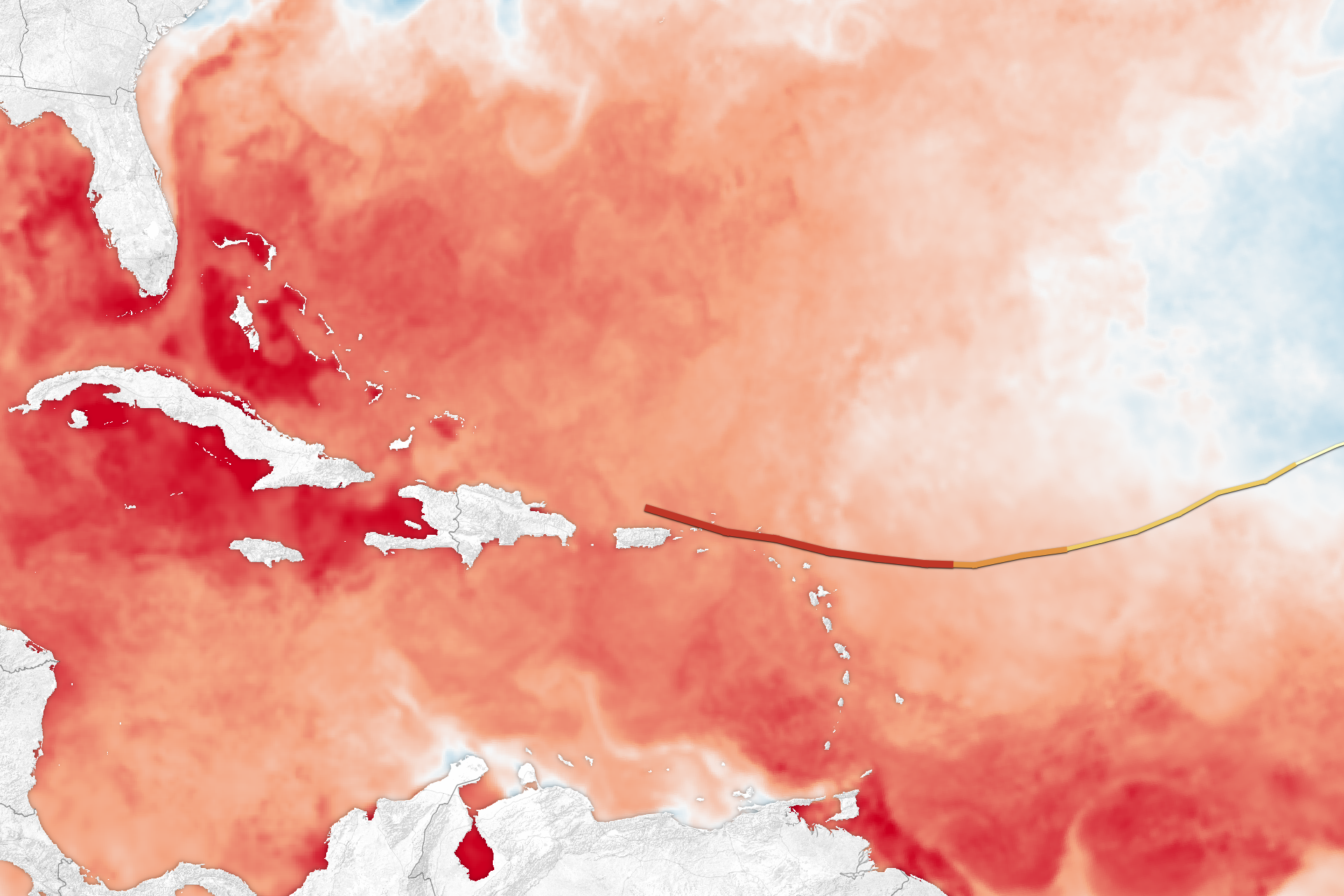
The map above shows sea surface temperatures in the Atlantic Ocean, Caribbean Sea, and Gulf of Mexico on September 5, 2017

Scientists pointed out that the increase of CO_{2} emissions contributes to warmer ocean waters and more moist air for rain. Because of sea level rise it is assumed that the storm surge of Hurricane Irma and other storms will cause greater flooding to vulnerable areas. Data collected by NASA showed that ocean surface temperatures in the path of Irma were above 30 °C (86 °F), capable of sustaining a Category 5 hurricane. Prior to affecting the U.S. mainland, Miami's mayor Tomás Regalado noted on Hurricane Irma, "This is the time to talk about climate change. This is the time that the president and the EPA and whoever makes decisions needs to talk about climate change." A day later the head of the EPA, Scott Pruitt said, "..to discuss the cause and effect of these storms, there's the… place (and time) to do that, it's not now." Following Irma's landfall, Donald Trump was asked about the connection between hurricanes and climate change, and stated that "We’ve had bigger storms than this." Richard Branson who was directly impacted by hurricane Irma noted, "..hurricanes are the start of things to come. Look, climate change is real. Ninety-nine per cent of scientists know it's real. The whole world knows it's real except for maybe one person in the White House."

United Nations secretary general António Guterres citing the devastation from hurricanes noted in September, "The catastrophic Atlantic hurricane season has been made worse by climate change. Cutting carbon emissions must clearly be part of our response to the disaster. The rise in the surface temperature of the ocean has had an impact on weather patterns and we must do everything possible to bring it down."

The Associated Press looked at the yearly average accumulated cyclone energy (ACE), which accounts for wind speed and storm duration to assess hurricane power of the past 30 years and found it to be 41 percent higher than the previous 30 years. They asked several experts about their opinion, James Kossin from NOAA "There's no question that the storms are stronger than they were 30 years ago." Climate scientist Stefan Rahmstorf of the Potsdam Institute for Climate Impact Research, "The only caveat being that the increase might be exaggerated somewhat because of undercounting early storms." Meteorologist Philip Klotzbach noted, "What's happening with hurricanes — the frequency, the duration, and the energy — is probably a combination of factors caused by both nature and man, a mish-mosh of everything." Kerry Emanuel who studies hurricanes, told the BBC, "The warming of the climate has increased the underlying probabilities of very heavy rain events like happened in Harvey and very high category hurricanes like Irma. It is just not sensible to say either storm was caused by climate change, but the underlying probabilities are going up."

== Summary ==
=== North Atlantic Ocean ===
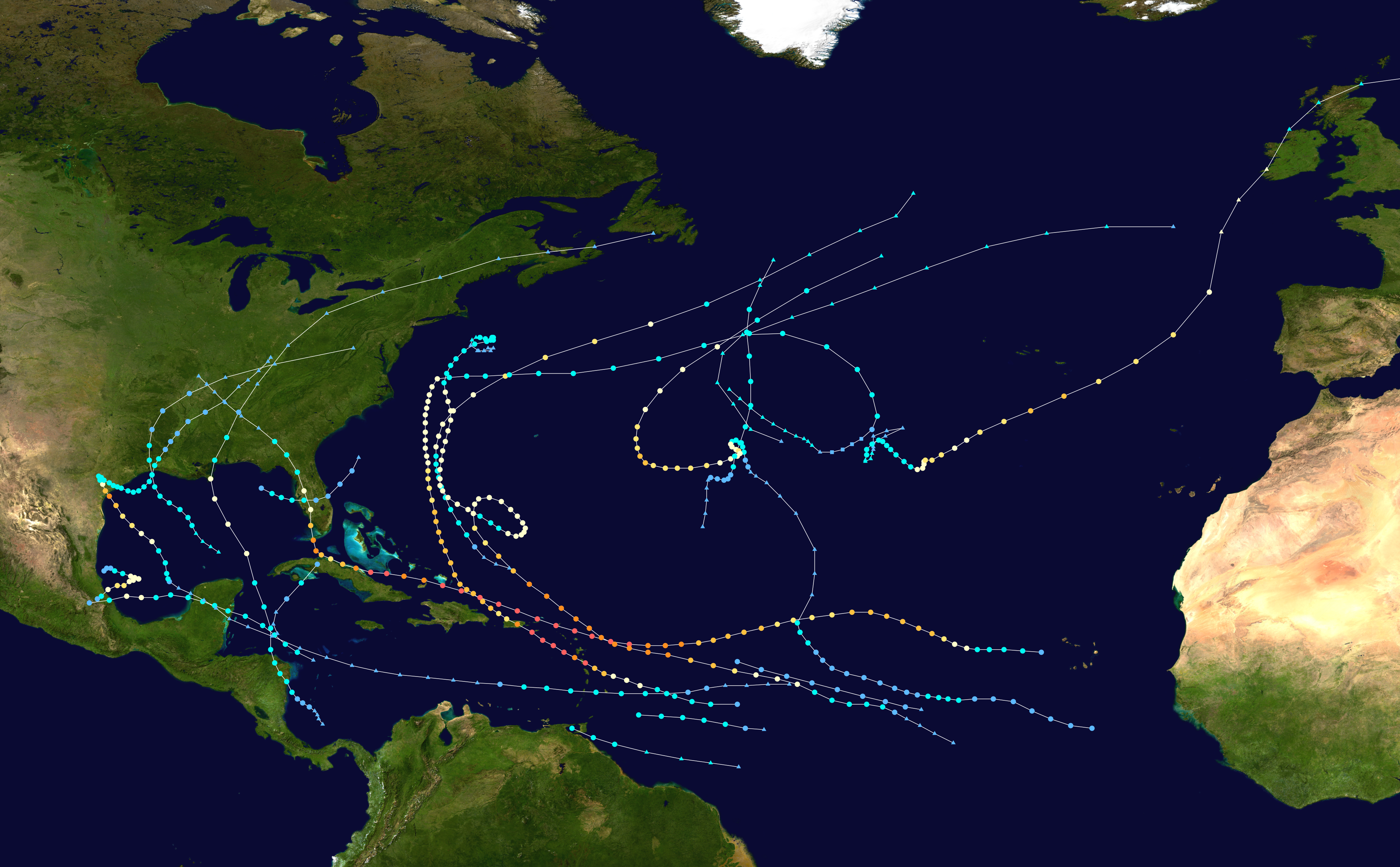
2017 Atlantic hurricane season summary map

The Atlantic basin was hyperactive with 17 named storms, 10 consecutive hurricanes, and 6 major hurricanes. It was also the second consecutive above-average season since 2016 and the costliest season on record. Most of the damage was caused by hurricanes Harvey, Irma, and Maria. Hurricane Nate was considered the worst natural disaster in Costa Rican history. Due to the damage that the four hurricanes made, the names Harvey, Irma, Maria, and Nate were retired by the WMO after the season.

The first named storm, Arlene, formed on April 19 as a subtropical depression. When Arlene was named on April 20, it became only the second named storm to form in April in the Atlantic, the other being Ana in 2003 and the strongest tropical cyclone on record in April. No storms formed in May.

Throughout June and July, activity increased with Tropical Storms Bret, Cindy, Don, and Emily and Tropical Depression Four. Tropical Storm Bret was the earliest named storm to form in the Main Development Region, affecting Venezuela and Trinidad and Tobago. Tropical Storm Cindy also existed throughout mid-June, affecting Louisiana. Together, both caused at least $28 million in damage and five deaths within the areas they affected. In July, tropical depression Four and tropical storms Don and Emily existed with the latter causing widespread floods throughout central Florida. Despite this activity within the first two months, most storms were weak or short-lived and resulted in the lowest ACE for the first five named storms on record, surpassing 1988.

In August, Hurricanes Franklin, Gert, Harvey, and Irma formed with the latter two causing catastrophic damage to the contiguous United States. Hurricane Harvey caused catastrophic flooding and was tied the costliest hurricane on record along with Hurricane Katrina in 2005. Harvey was also the wettest tropical cyclone ever recorded in the United States with a rainfall total of 60.58 inches in Nederland, Texas. Hurricane Irma caused a trail of damage from the Leeward Islands to Florida, causing $77.2 billion in damage, and became the first Category 5 hurricane to make landfall in the Leeward Islands.

In September, copious activity occurred with Hurricanes Jose, Katia, Lee, and Maria, with the latter becoming the tenth most intense hurricane on record. Along with the four systems, Irma also persisted through early September, making it and Maria the first Category 5 hurricanes to occur within the same month. Hurricane Maria caused catastrophic damage to Puerto Rico and Dominica with over 3,000 fatalities and $91.606 billion in damage. Accumulated cyclone energy also increased rapidly during this month, resulting in three hurricanes achieving an ACE over 40, the first on record to do so, September 8 becoming the most active day on record based on ACE, and Hurricane Irma achieving the third-highest ACE on record in the Atlantic with 64.9 units.

By October, activity still persisted although the potential for a La Niña would begin peaking by November. Hurricane Nate became the worst natural disaster in Costa Rican history as a precursor, while Ophelia became the worst tropical cyclone to affect Ireland in 50 years. Philippe was a short-lived system that contributed to a bomb cyclone shortly after its dissipation.

Finally, Tropical Storm Rina became the last storm to form in this basin, dissipating on November 9. The extratropical remnants of this system later contributed to Cyclone Numa (or Storm Zenon), which affected Greece, Italy, France, Tunisia, and Turkey and caused the worst weather event in Greece since 1977. The season ended on November 30.

=== Eastern and Central Pacific Oceans ===
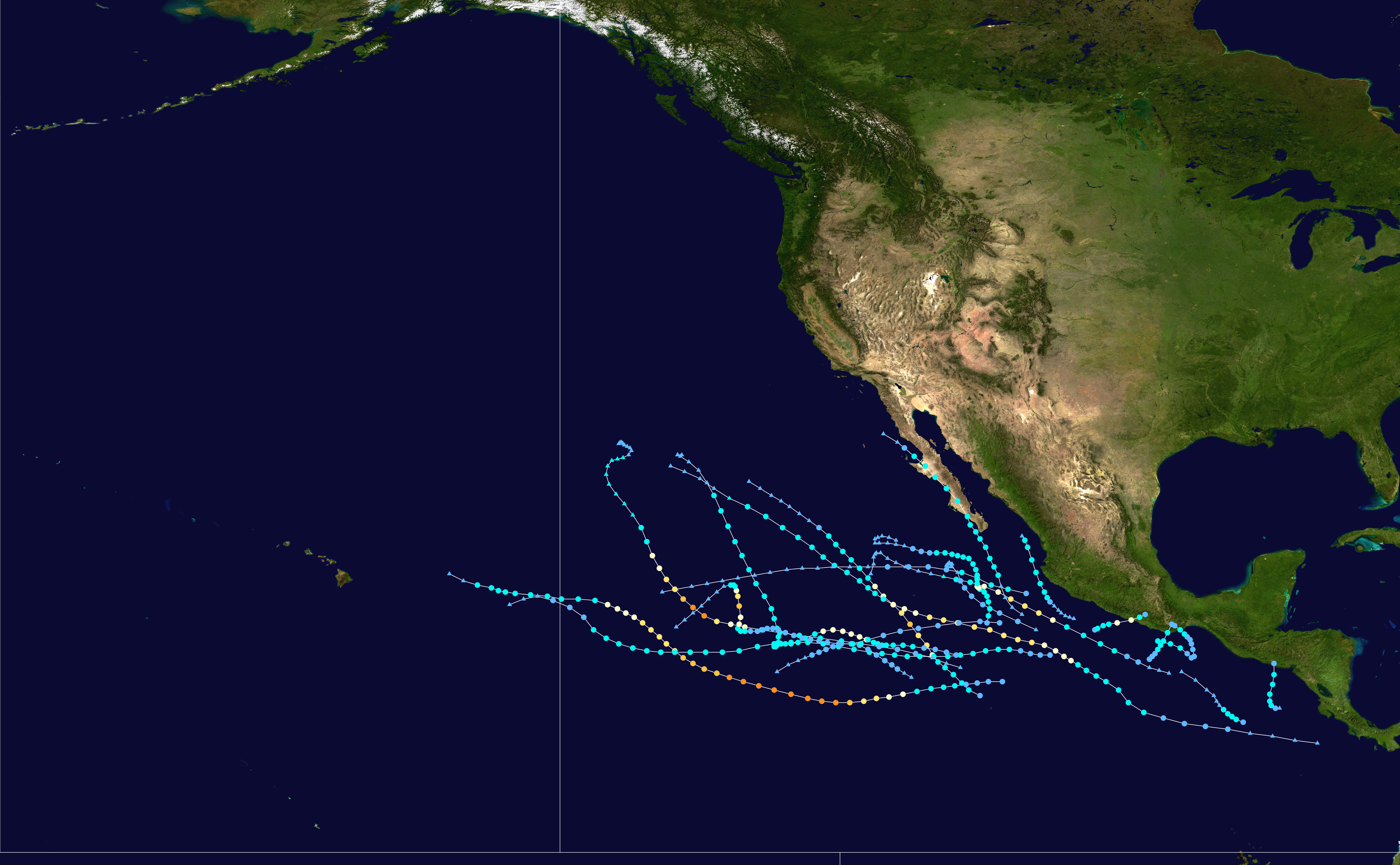
2017 Pacific hurricane season summary map

The 2017 Pacific hurricane season was a moderately active season with eighteen named storms, nine hurricanes, and four major hurricanes. Unlike the three previous hyperactive seasons (2014, 2015, and 2016), the season was significantly less active in terms of ACE and most storms that existed through this basin were either weak or short-lived.

Early May saw the formation of Tropical Storm Adrian, which was the earliest named tropical cyclone to exist east of 140°W at the time; it was surpassed by Tropical Storm Andres in 2021. Throughout June and July, the basin saw some considerable activity, with the latter month having the fifth-highest ACE in the Eastern Pacific. Storms that existed during this time include Hurricanes Dora, Eugene, Fernanda, Hilary, Irwin, Tropical Storms Beatriz, Calvin, and Greg, and Tropical Depression Eight-E, which contributed to the ACE count throughout the earlier parts of the season. Throughout August and September, activity decreased significantly, but stagnated in terms of named storms with some being short-lived. For example, in September, only four named storms formed (Otis, Max, Norma and Pilar) and October featured tropical storms Ramon and Selma, in which none attained hurricane status. Selma became the first named storm to make landfall in El Salvador and also contributed to the formation of Philippe in the Atlantic. No storms have formed in November since 2010.

In the Central Pacific, no storms have formed since 2011. The season began on June 1 and both seasons ended on November 30, 2017.

=== Western Pacific Ocean ===
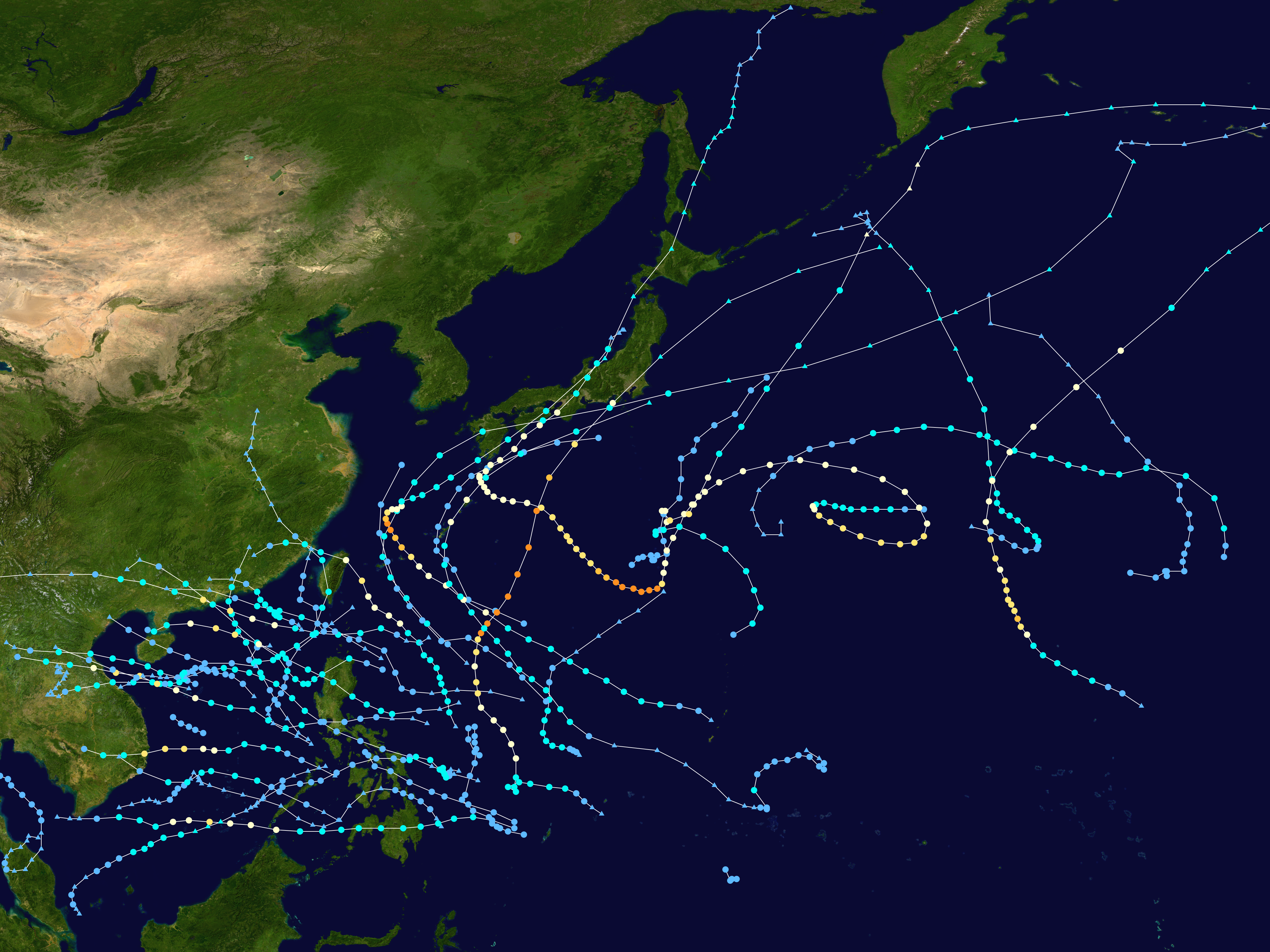
2017 Pacific typhoon season summary map

The 2017 Pacific typhoon season was a below-average season in terms of accumulated cyclone energy and the number of typhoons and super typhoons, and the first since the 1977 season to not produce a Category 5-equivalent typhoon on the Saffir–Simpson scale.

The first half of the season was relatively inactive, with only seven systems developing, of which only two intensified into tropical storms. The first system of 2017 developed on January 7, and was named Auring by PAGASA. Tropical Depression Bising developed during the first week of February, and was a factor in, and worsened the effects of, the 2017 Visayas and Mindanao floods. This was followed by Crising, the third system unofficially named by PAGASA. Heavy rains from the depression caused flooding that led to the deaths of 10 people in Cebu, Philippines. Shortly after the dissipation of Crising came the formation of the first tropical storm of the season – Muifa. The system was not strong, however, and was located away from all major land areas, so it caused no damage. No systems formed during the month of May, the first such occurrence since 2013. The next cyclone, Merbok, formed during mid-June, and made landfall in Shenzhen in China. The cyclone was short-lived; however, it was relatively strong, producing winds of 100 km/h (60 mph) at its peak. Nanmadol passed over the Ryukyu Islands and progressed to make landfall in Nagasaki on Japan's island of Kyushu during early July. Torrential rainfall and strong winds from the cyclone itself and from the stormy weather that persisted for a number of days were responsible for major damage and 41 fatalities across mainland Japan.

By the middle of July, tropical activity had increased with simultaneous tropical storms developing after July 14. Severe Tropical Storm Talas formed during mid-July near the Paracel Islands in the South China Sea, and traveled generally westwards. It made landfall in Vietnam after brushing China's Hainan province and, unusually, continued to track far inland to the Laos–Thailand border before weakening to a depression. At least 14 deaths were attributed to the storm, primarily as a result of flooding. Later, the season was very active with 7 storms in late July-early August. Typhoon Noru reached Category 4 super typhoon in peak intensity and made landfall in Japan, causing $100 million in damage. Tropical Storm Sonca made landfall in Quảng Trị, Vietnam; 2017 was the first year since 1971 where 2 storms made landfall in Central Vietnam in July. Sonca brought heavy rainfall in Northeast Thailand and caused extreme flooding in the region with estimated costs of over US$300 million. Typhoon Nesat and Tropical storm Haitang made landfall in Taiwan and Fujian (a province in China), respectively, 2 days apart. In mid-late August, Typhoon Hato and Tropical Storm Pakhar made landfall in Macau and Guangdong respectively while they were at peak intensity. So far Typhoon Hato is the costliest tropical cyclone in Northwest Pacific in 2017 with damages totalling $6.82 billion.

The season was weaker in September. Typhoon Talim made landfall in Japan as a minimal typhoon and caused US$700 million in damage. Typhoon Doksuri made landfall in Quảng Bình, Vietnam as a Category 3 typhoon; damage was very major as the total was estimated at over US$814 million. In early October a tropical depression made landfall in Northern and North Central Vietnam, which brought very heavy rainfall and was responsible for the worst flooding in Northern and North-Central Vietnam, with 109 deaths and total damages of over US$570 million. Later, Typhoon Khanun made landfall in Southern China. So far Typhoon Lan has been the strongest tropical cyclone in the basin in 2017, and became the second largest tropical cyclone on record.

In November, La Niña was returned and tropical activity had increased with simultaneous tropical storms developing, and most of them moved west and affected Philippines and Vietnam. Typhoon Damrey made landfall in Khánh Hòa, Vietnam and became one of the costliest typhoon in Vietnamese history since 1975; and it is one of the costliest and deadliest typhoon in the basin in 2017 with total damage reached US$1.03 billion and 151 deaths. Later, two weak storms affected Philippines. In December, Tropical storm Kai-tak caused flooding in Central Philippines. Typhoon Tembin was responsible for severe flooding and landslides in South Philippines, it became the deadliest tropical cyclone in 2017 with over 250 deaths. Typhoon Tembin moved South into the China Sea, so 2017 became the most active tropical cyclone season in the South China Sea with 22 Tropical cyclones, and Tembin affected Southern Vietnam.

=== North Indian Ocean ===
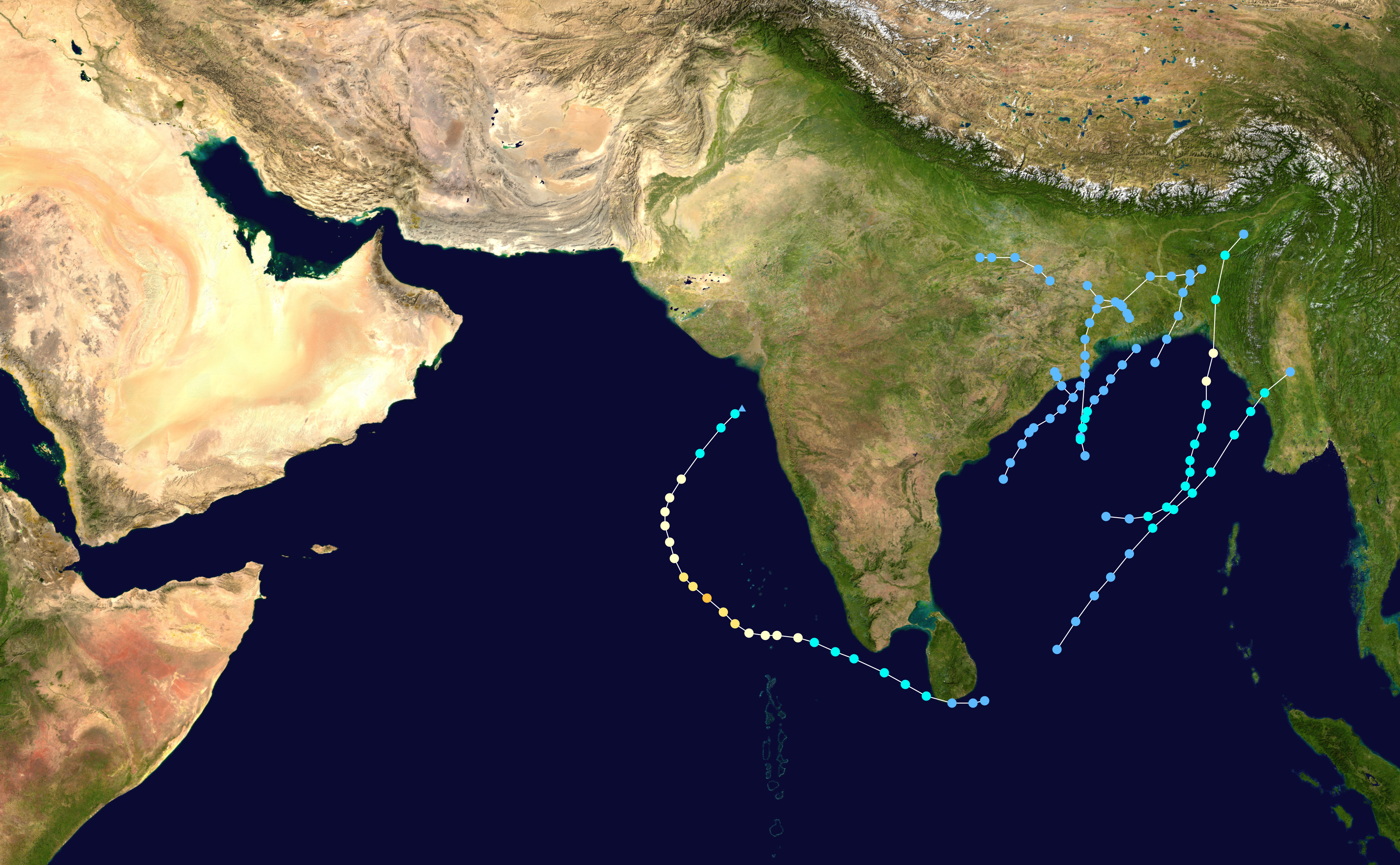
2017 North Indian Ocean cyclone season map

The 2017 North Indian Ocean cyclone season was a below average yet deadly season in the annual cycle of tropical cyclone formation. This season produced only three named storms, of which one only intensified into a very severe cyclonic storm.

The season officially had an early start compared with the last two seasons, with the formation of Cyclone Maarutha over the Bay of Bengal in mid-April. Cyclone Mora, formed in late May over the Bay of Bengal. At its peak intensity, it was equivalent to a marginal Category 1 hurricane on the Saffir–Simpson hurricane wind scale. The cyclone produced severe flooding across Sri Lanka, India, Myanmar and Bangladesh and caused 15 deaths directly and 208 deaths indirectly. The floods persisted in Bangladesh since a Deep Depression over Bay of Bengal made landfall and killed 156 people in Bangladesh. A depression formed in northwestern Bay of Bengal and produced torrential rainfall. It was followed by a depression over Jharkhand which killed 70 people in West Bengal. Under the influence of strong monsoon surge a disturbance developed over Bay of Bengal travelled westwards and intensified to an unnamed depression. It also affected neighboring Karachi in Pakistan. A strong monsoon surge prevented formation of systems until a deep depression formed over West Bengal in October and caused heavy rainfall. A couple of depressions formed between mid-October and November which continued the rain spell causing destruction of life and property. Very Severe Cyclonic Storm Ockhi formed in early December and wreaked havoc in the countries where it impacted. It was equivalent to a strong Category 3 hurricane on the Saffir–Simpson scale at peak intensity. The twin storm of Ockhi was a deep depression which originated in Bay of Bengal while its counterpart was in Arabian Sea.

== Systems ==
=== January ===
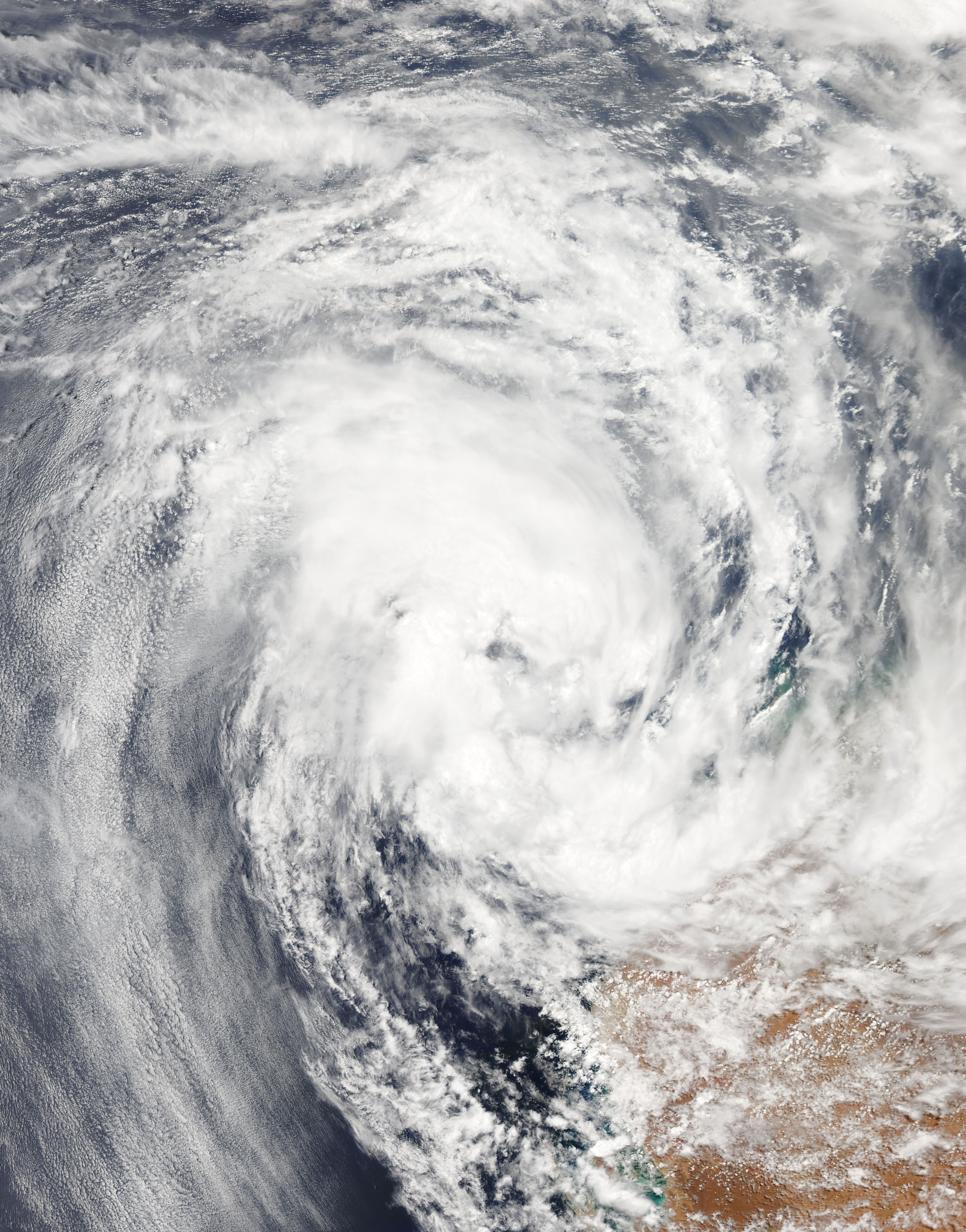
Tropical Low 14U

In January 2017, 12 storms formed. Tropical Low 14U, the strongest system this January 2017, affected the Northern Territory and the Western Australia. Surprisingly, 01W (Auring) formed on January 7 on the West Pacific and lasted until the 16th.

Tropical cyclones formed in January 2017
Storm name	Dates active	Max wind km/h (mph)	Pressure (hPa)	Areas affected	Damage (USD)	Deaths	Refs
06F	January 2–6	Unspecified	1002	None	None	None	
08U	January 3–7	Unspecified	994	Northern Territory, Western Australia	None	None	
09U	January 3–15	Unspecified	1003	Cocos (Keeling) Islands, Christmas Island	None	None	
10U	January 7–12	Unspecified	1001	Northern Territory	None	None	
11U	January 7–8	Unspecified	1000	Queensland	None	None	
01W (Auring)	January 7–16	55 (35)	1002	Philippines, Vietnam, Cambodia	$140 thousand	11	
07F	January 10–20	Unspecified	998	None	None	None	
08F	January 10–11	Unspecified	1009	None	None	None	
12U	January 18–19	Unspecified	Unspecified	None	None	None	
13U	January 21–25	Unspecified	1009	None	None	None	
14U	January 23–31	85 (50)	988	Northern Territory, Western Australia	None	None	
03	January 27–28	55 (35)	1005	None	None	None	

=== February ===
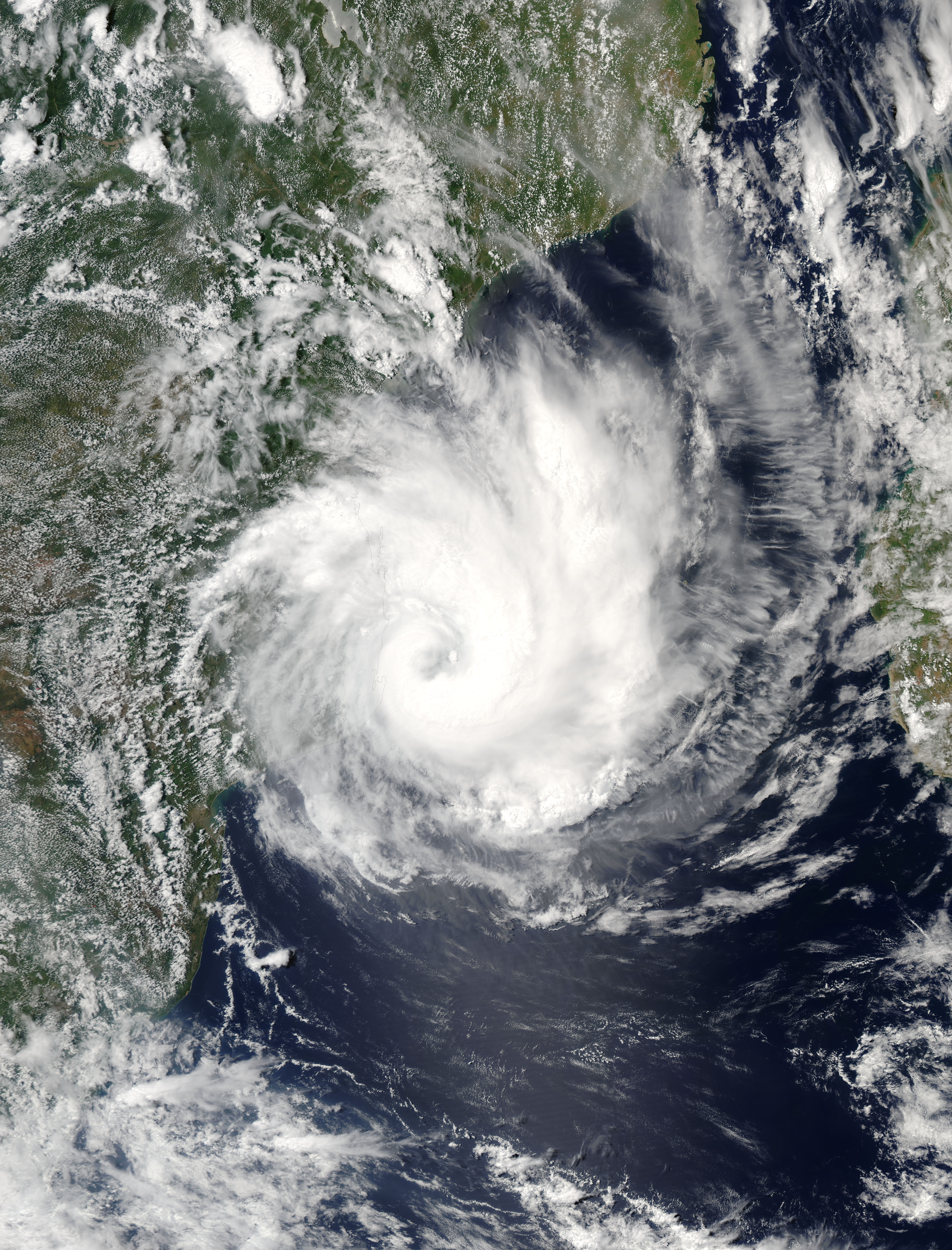
Cyclone Dineo

In February, 16 systems formed. Cyclone Dineo, one of the deadliest tropical cyclones on record in the South-West Indian Ocean and Southern Hemisphere, hit Mozambique and lasted from February 13 to 17th of the same month. On the West Pacific, Bising formed and lasted from 3rd – 7th of this month.

Tropical cyclones formed in February 2017
Storm name	Dates active	Max wind km/h (mph)	Min pressure (mbar)	Areas affected	Damage (USD)	Deaths	Refs
Carlos	February 2–10	130 (80)	965	None	None	None	
Bising	February 3–7	55 (35)	1000	None	None	None	
09F	February 5–11	Unspecified	999	Fiji	None	None	
10F	February 7–11	Unspecified	993	Fiji, Vanuatu	None	None	
15U	February 7–11	Unspecified	984	Western Australia	Unknown	2	
16U	February 9–10	Unspecified	Unspecified	New Caledonia	None	None	
11F	February 9–12	Unspecified	1002	Vanuatu, Fiji	None	None	
17U	February 11–12	Unspecified	1004	Northern Territory	None	None	
Dineo	February 13–17	140 (85)	955	Mozambique, South Africa, Zimbabwe, Botswana, Malawi	$217 million	280	
12F	February 15–24	Unspecified	1002	Fiji	None	None	
13F	February 15–18	Unspecified	998	None	None	None	
14F	February 16–22	55 (35)	997	Fiji	None	None	
18U	February 16–22	Unspecified	Unspecified	None	None	None	
Alfred	February 16–22	85 (50)	994	Northern Territory, Queensland	Unknown	Unknown	
Bart	February 19–22	75 (45)	994	Southern Cook Islands	None	None	
16F	February 23–26	Unspecified	1005	None	None	None	

=== March ===
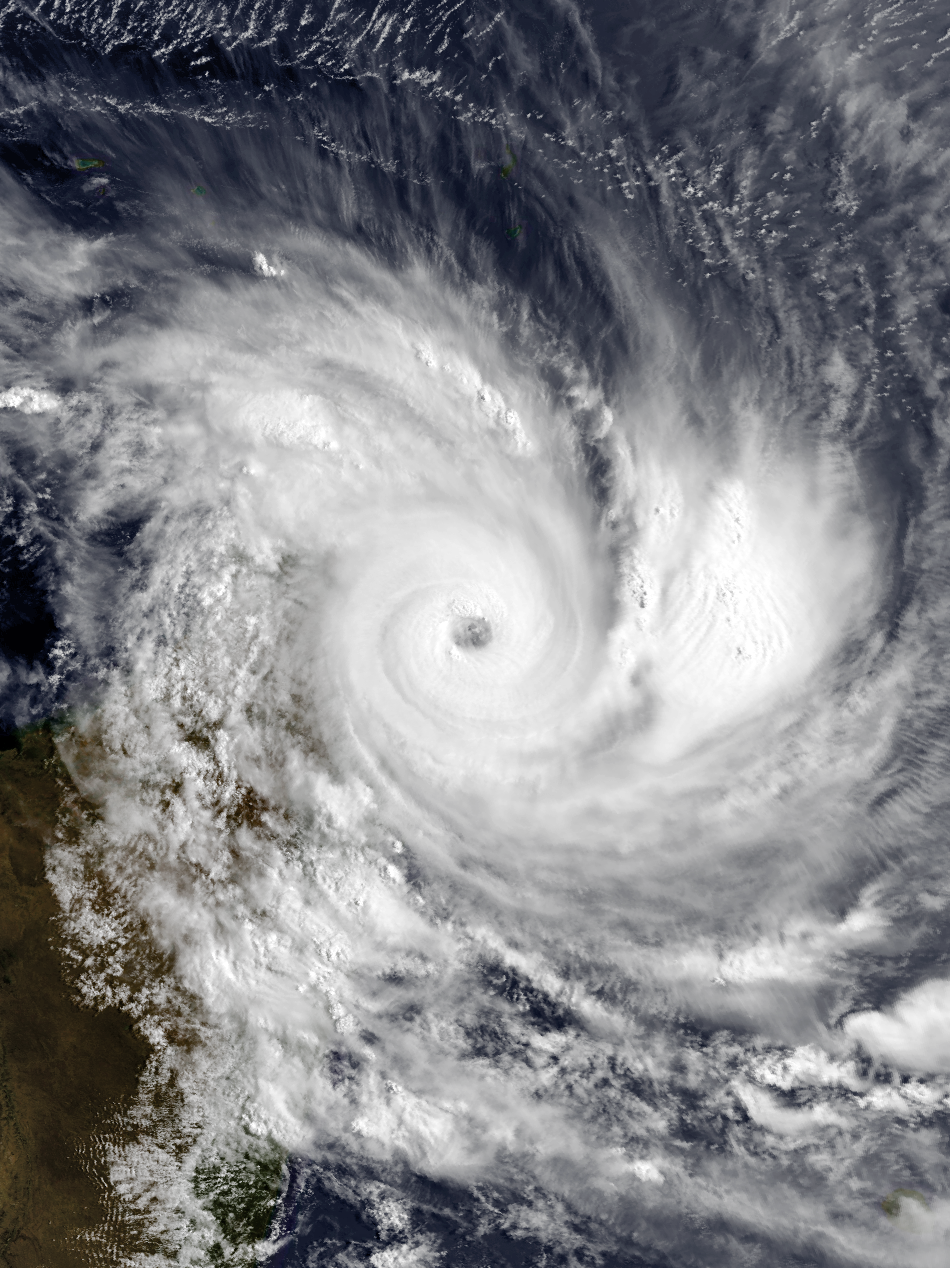
Cyclone Enawo

On March, 11 storms formed. Cyclone Enawo, was the strongest cyclone to strike Madagascar since Gafilo in 2004.

Tropical cyclones formed in March 2017
Storm name	Dates active	Max wind km/h (mph)	Min pressure (mbar)	Areas affected	Damage (USD)	Deaths	Refs
Blanche	March 2–7	100 (65)	984	Northern Territory, Western Australia	None	None	
Enawo	March 2–7	205 (125)	932	Madagascar, Réunion	$20 million	99	
17F	March 4–5	Unspecified	1006	None	None	None	
Fernando	March 6–14	70 (45)	992	Rodriques	None	None	
21U	March 14–18	Unspecified	Unspecified	None	None	None	
TD	March 19–21	Unspecified	1008	Philippines	None	None	
18F	March 19–21	Unspecified	1007	None	None	None	
22U	March 20–24	95 (60)	985	Western Australia	None	None	
Caleb	March 23–27	85 (50)	989	Cocos (Keeling) Islands	None	None	
Debbie	March 23–30	175 (110)	949	Queensland, New South Wales, New Zealand	$2.67 billion	14	
25U	March 23–26	Unspecified	Unspecified	None	None	None	

=== April ===
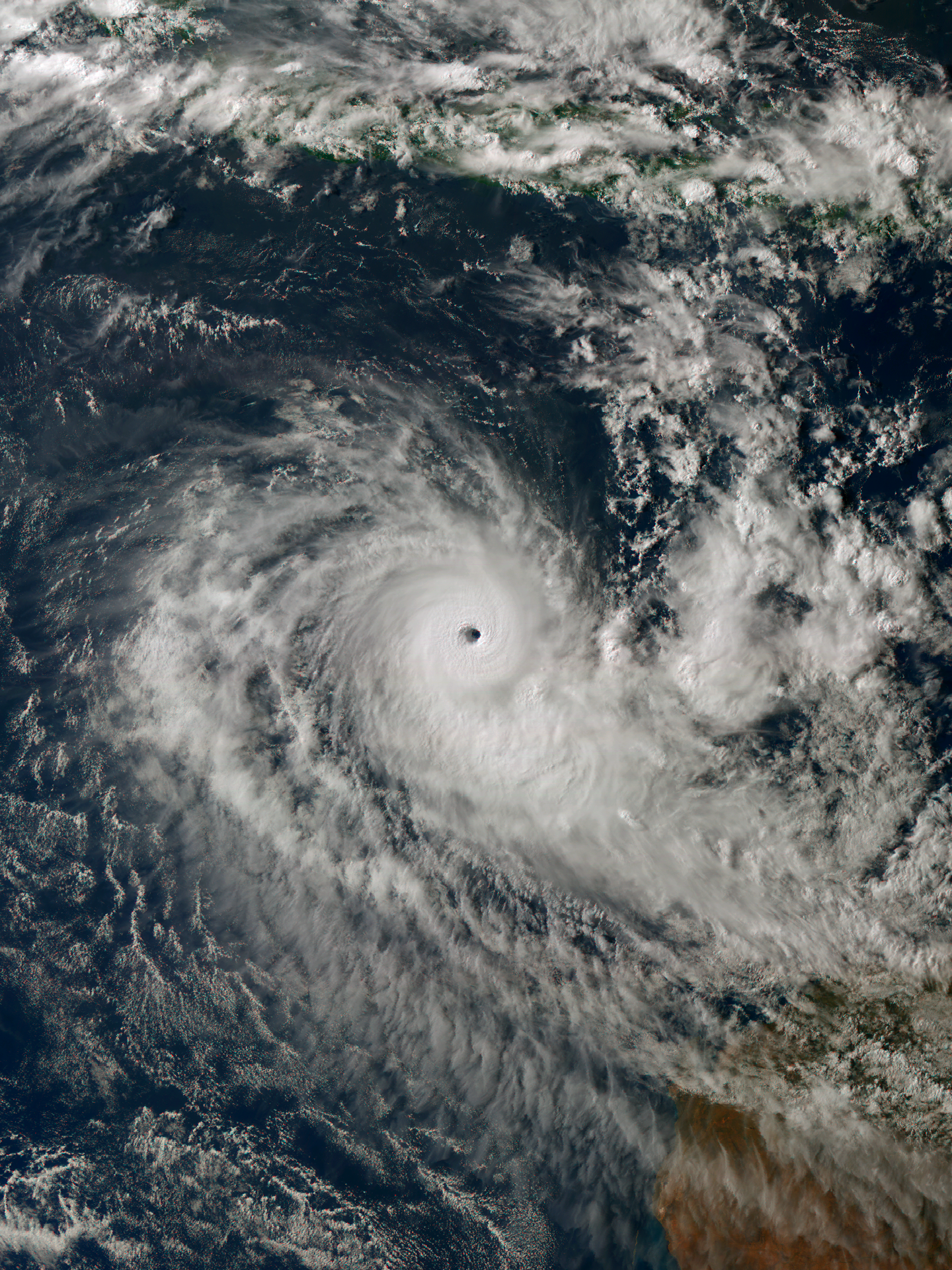
Cyclone Ernie

10 storms formed on April. One notable storm is Cyclone Ernie on Australian Region, is one of the quickest strengthening tropical cyclone on modern record. Crising also formed and affected Philippines in its lifespan.

Tropical cyclones formed in April 2017
Storm name	Dates active	Max wind km/h (mph)	Min pressure (mbar)	Areas affected	Damage (USD)	Deaths	Refs
19F	April 1–20	Unspecified	988	Samoa, Niue	None	None	
Ernie	April 5–10	220 (140)	922	None	None	None	
27U	April 6–16	55 (35)	998	Northern Territory, Western Australia	None	None	
Cook	April 6–10	155 (100)	961	Vanuatu, New Caledonia, New Zealand	Moderate	1	
02W (Crising)	April 13–20	55 (35)	1006	Philippines, Taiwan	$1.7 million	10	
Maarutha	April 15–17	75 (45)^{3}	996	Myanmar, Andaman and Nicobar Islands, Thailand, Yunnan	$23.4 thousand	4	
Arlene	April 19–21	85 (50)^{4}	990	None	None	None	
Frances	April 21 – May 1	120 (75)	980	New Guinea, Maluku, Northern Territory, Timor, Western Australia	None	None	
Muifa (Dante)	April 22–29	65 (40)	1002	None	None	None	
Greg	April 29 – May 3	65 (40)	997	None	None	None	

=== May ===
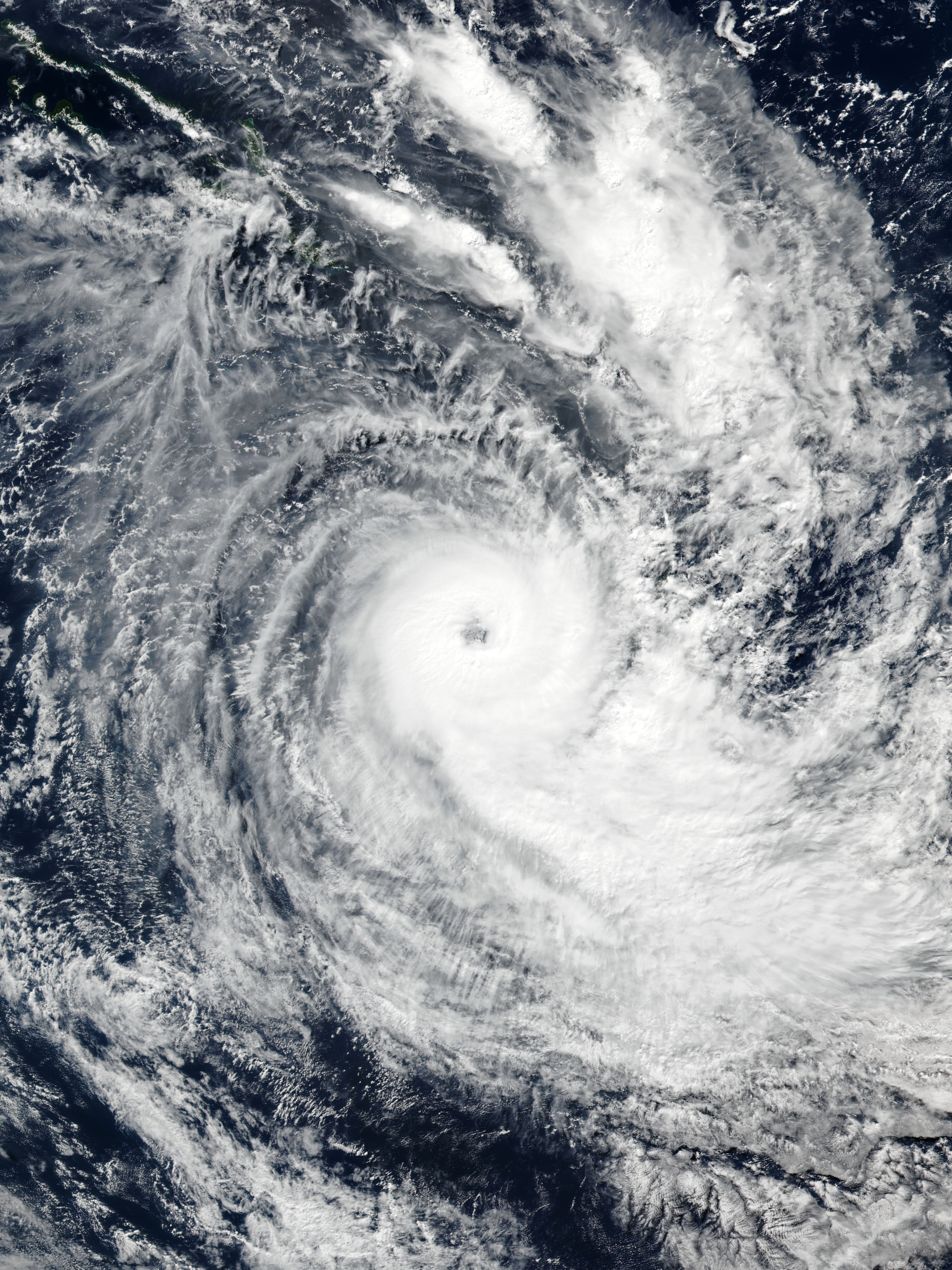
Cyclone Donna

5 systems formed on May. Tropical Storm Adrian, the earliest-known formation of a named storm in eastern Pacific proper, formed on May 9 and lasted until 10th of this month. Cyclone Donna also formed, which is the strongest Off-season South Pacific Cyclone on the month of May.

Tropical cyclones formed in May 2017
Storm name	Dates active	Max wind km/h (mph)	Min pressure (mbar)	Areas affected	Damage (USD)	Deaths	Refs
Donna	May 1–10	205 (125)	935	Solomon Islands, Vanuatu, Fiji, New Caledonia, New Zealand	Significant	2	
Ella	May 7–14	110 (70)	977	Samoan Islands, Tonga, Wallis and Futuna	None	None	
Adrian	May 9–10	75 (45)^{4}	1004	None	None	None	
Mora	May 28–31	110 (70)^{3}	978	Sri Lanka, Andaman and Nicobar Islands, East India, Northeast India, Bangladesh, Myanmar, Bhutan, Tibet	$1.36 billion	135	
Beatriz	May 31 – June 2	75 (45)^{4}	1001	Southwestern Mexico	$3.7 million	7	

=== June ===
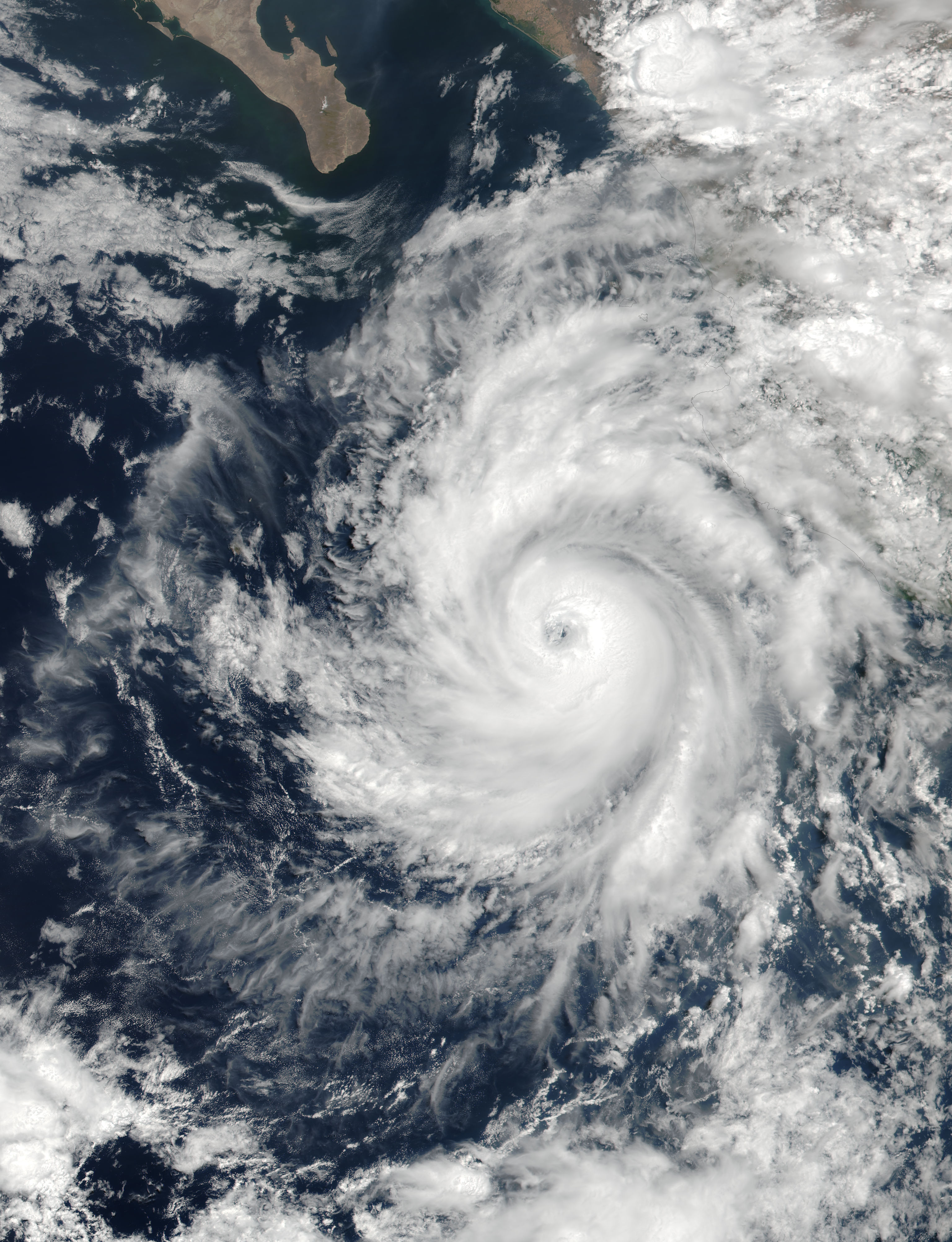
Hurricane Dora

7 systems formed on this month. On this list is Tropical Storm Bret, a tropical storm from a low-latitude tropical wave that affected Trinidad and Tobago, Guyana, Venezuela, and Windward Islands., and Hurricane Dora (2017), that affected Southwestern Mexico. Also included is Severe Tropical Merbok from Western Pacific Ocean.

Tropical cyclones formed in June 2017
Storm name	Dates active	Max wind km/h (mph)	Min pressure (mbar)	Areas affected	Damage (USD)	Deaths	Refs
Merbok	June 10–13	100 (65)	985	Philippines, South China	$90.8 million	None	
Calvin	June 11–13	75 (45)^{4}	1004	Southwestern Mexico, Guatemala	Unknown	None	
BOB 03	June 11–13	55 (35)^{3}	988	Northeast India, Bangladesh	$223 million	170	
Bret	June 19–20	85 (50)^{4}	1007	Guyana, Venezuela, Trinidad and Tobago, Windward Islands	≥$3 million	2	
Cindy	June 20–23	95 (60)^{4}	991	Honduras, Belize, Cayman Islands, Yucatán Peninsula, Cuba, Southern United States, Eastern United States	$25 million	2	
Dora	June 25–28	165 (105)^{4}	974	Southwestern Mexico	Minimum	None	
TD	June 29 – July 1	Unspecified	1008	Japan	None	None	

=== July ===
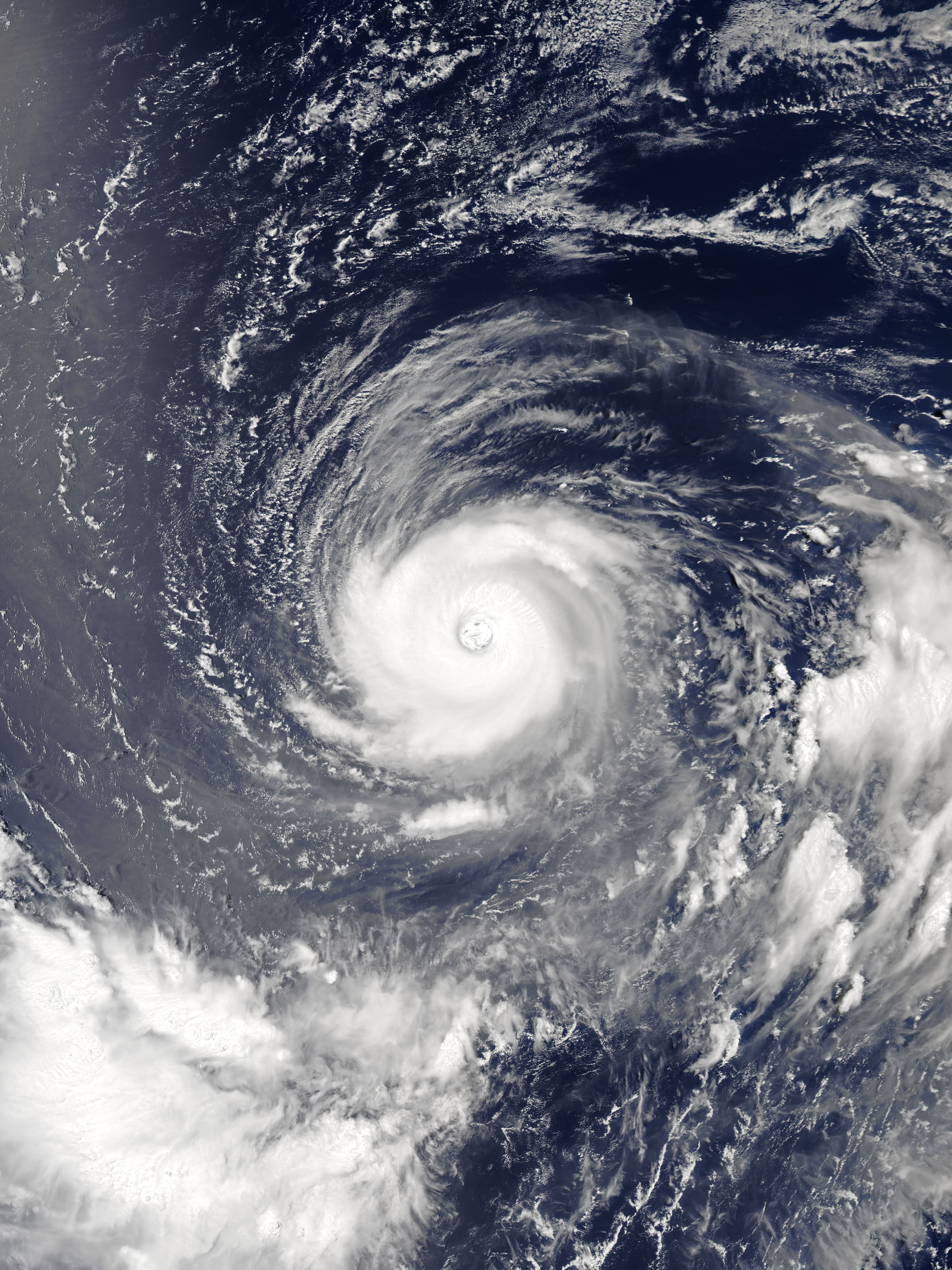
Typhoon Noru

23 systems formed on the month of July, making it the busiest month of this year. On the West Pacific, Tropical Storm Nanmadol, Tropical Storm Talas, Typhoon Noru, Tropical Storm Kulap, Tropical Storm Sonca, Tropical Storm Roke (Fabian), Typhoon Nesat, Tropical Storm Haitang (Huaning) and Tropical Storm Nalgae formed. On the East Pacific, Hurricanes Eugene, Fernanda, Hilary and Irwin., a depression and Tropical Storm Greg formed. On the Atlantic, Tropical Storm Don, Tropical Storm Emily, and a weak depression formed. On the North Indian Ocean, two depressions formed.

Tropical cyclones formed in July 2017
Storm name	Dates active	Max wind km/h (mph)	Min pressure (mbar)	Areas affected	Damage (USD)	Deaths	Refs
Nanmadol (Emong)	July 1–4	100 (65)	985	Japan	$1.99 billion	41	
TD	July 4–7	55 (35)	1010	Taiwan, Ryukyu Islands	None	None	
Four	July 5–7	45 (30)^{4}	1009	None	None	None	
Eugene	July 7–12	185 (115)^{4}	966	Baja California Peninsula, California	None	None	
Fernanda	July 12–22	230 (145)^{4}	948	Hawaii	None	None	
TD	July 13–16	55 (35)	1006	None	None	None	
Talas	July 14–17	95 (60)	985	Hainan, Indochina	$80.1 million	14	
Don	July 17–18	85 (50)^{4}	1005	Windward Islands, Barbados, Trinidad and Tobago	None	None	
Eight-E	July 17–20	55 (35)^{4}	1007	None	None	None	
Greg	July 17–26	95 (60)^{4}	1000	None	None	None	
BOB 04	July 18–19	45 (30)^{3}	992	Orissa, Madhya Pradesh, Chhattisgarh	$34.3 million	7	
Noru	July 19 – August 8	175 (110)	935	Japan	$100 million	2	
Kulap	July 20–28	75 (45)	1002	None	None	None	
Hilary	July 21–30	175 (110)^{4}	969	Southwestern Mexico	None	None	
Sonca	July 21–29	65 (40)	994	Hainan, Indochina	$306 million	37	
Roke (Fabian)	July 21–23	65 (40)	1002	Philippines, Taiwan, South China	None	None	
Irwin	July 22 – August 1	150 (90)^{4}	970	None	None	None	
Nesat (Gorio)	July 25–30	150 (90)	960	Philippines, Ryukyu Islands, Taiwan, East China	$281 million	3	
TD	July 25–29	55 (35)	1006	None	None	None	
LAND 01	July 26–27	45 (30)^{3}	992	West Bengal, Jharkhand, Madhya Pradesh	$2.19 billion	152	
Haitang (Huaning)	July 27 – August 2	85 (50)	985	Taiwan, East China	$3.77 million	None	
Emily	July 30 – August 1	95 (60)^{4}	1001	Florida	$10 million	None	
Nalgae	July 31 – August 5	85 (50)	990	None	None	None	

=== August ===
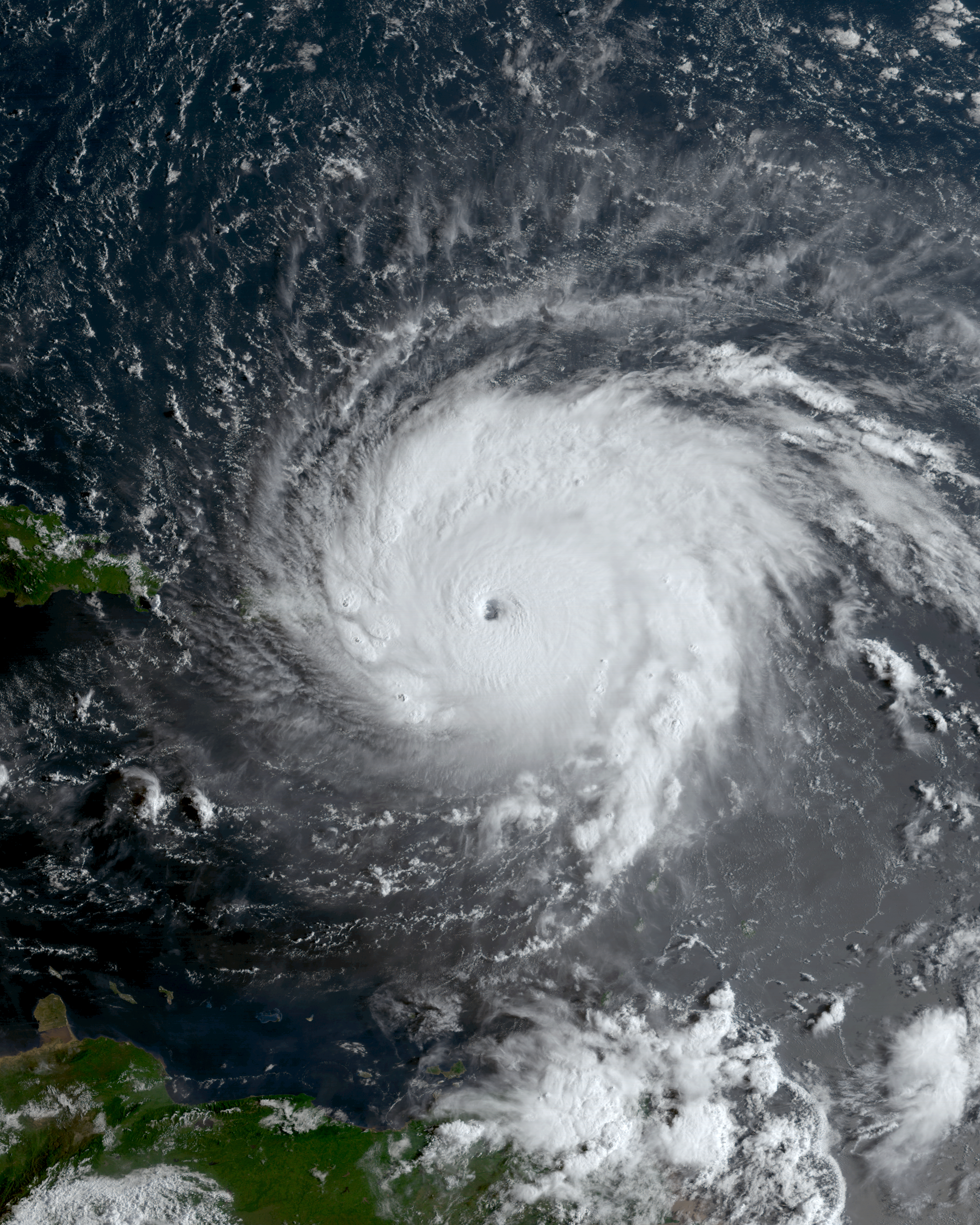
Hurricane Irma

15 storms formed in August 2017. Typhoons Banyan, Hato, Tropical Storm Pakhar, Typhoon Sanvu, and Severe Tropical Storm Mawar formed on the West Pacific. On the Atlantic, Hurricanes Franklin, Gert, Harvey, and Irma formed. On the East Pacific, a weak depression, Tropical Storm Jova, Hurricane Kenneth and another tropical storm, Tropical Storm Lidia formed.

Tropical cyclones formed in August 2017
Storm name	Dates active	Max wind km/h (mph)	Min pressure (mbar)	Areas affected	Damage (USD)	Deaths	Refs
Eleven-E	August 4–5	55 (35)^{4}	1006	None	None	None	
Franklin	August 7–10	140 (85)^{4}	981	Nicaragua, Honduras, Guatemala, Cayman Islands, Belize, Yucatán Peninsula, Central Mexico	$15 million	None	
01U	August 8	35 (25)	1005	None	None	None	
Banyan	August 10–17	150 (90)	955	None	None	None	
Jova	August 12–14	65 (40)^{4}	1003	Western Mexico	None	None	
Gert	August 12–17	175 (110)^{4}	962	Bermuda, East Coast of the United States, Atlantic Canada	None	2	
Harvey	August 17 – September 1	215 (130)^{4}	937	Barbados, Suriname, Guyana, Windward Islands, Jamaica, Cayman Islands, Nicaragua, Belize, Yucatán Peninsula, Northeastern Mexico, Southern United States (Texas, Louisiana), Eastern United States	$125 billion	107	
Kenneth	August 18 – 23	215 (130)	951	None	None	None	
Hato (Isang)	August 19–24	140 (85)	965	Philippines, Taiwan, South China, Vietnam	$6.4 billion	24	
Pakhar (Jolina)	August 24–27	100 (65)	985	Philippines, South China, Vietnam, Thailand	$115 million	13	
TD	August 25–26	Unspecified	1002	Vietnam	None	None	
Sanvu	August 27 – September 3	150 (90)	955	Mariana Islands, Ogasawara Islands	Unknown	1	
TD	August 28–29	55 (35)	1002	Philippines	Unknown	None	
Mawar	August 30 – September 4	95 (60)	990	Philippines, South China	$1.53 million	None	
Irma	August 30 – September 12	285 (180)^{4}	914	Cape Verde, Leeward Islands (Barbuda, Saint Martin, Saint Barthélemy, U.S. Virgin Islands), Puerto Rico, Hispaniola, Turks and Caicos Islands, The Bahamas, Cuba, Southeastern United States (Florida and Georgia), Northeastern United States	$64.76 billion	134	
Lidia	August 31 – September 3	100 (65)^{4}	986	Western Mexico, Baja California Peninsula, Arizona, California	$36.1 million	20	

=== September ===
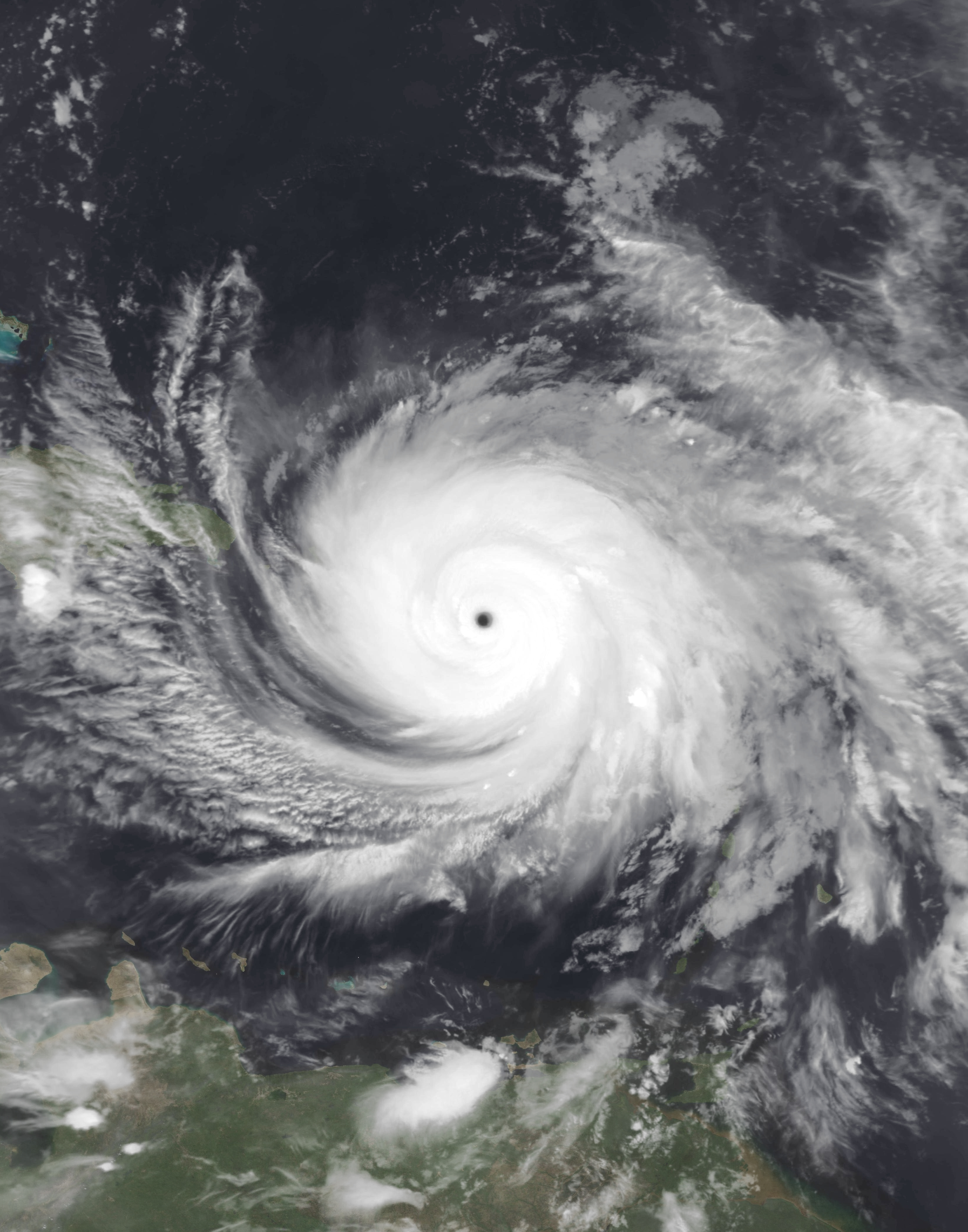
Hurricane Maria

12 cyclones existed in September 2017. In the Western Pacific, Typhoons Talim and Doksuri, as well as Tropical Storm Guchol and Tropical Depression 22W (Nando) formed. In the Eastern Pacific, Hurricanes Otis, Max, Norma, and Tropical Storm Pilar existed during September. The strongest cyclone of September was Hurricane Maria, which was the second Category 5 hurricane to make landfall in the Atlantic in 2017. Hurricanes Jose, Katia, and Lee also existed in the Atlantic.

Tropical cyclones formed in September 2017
Storm name	Dates active	Max wind km/h (mph)	Min pressure (mbar)	Areas affected	Damage (USD)	Deaths	Refs
Guchol (Kiko)	September 3–7	65 (40)	1000	Philippines, Taiwan, East China	None	None	
Jose	September 5–22	250 (155)	938	Leeward Islands, East Coast of the United States	$2.84 million	0 (1)	
Katia	September 5–9	165 (105)	972	Eastern Mexico	$3.26 million	3 (0)	
Talim (Lannie)	September 8–17	175 (110)	935	Mariana Islands, Taiwan, East China, Japan	$750 million	5	
Doksuri (Maring)	September 10–16	150 (90)	955	Philippines, Hainan, Indochina, Bangladesh	$819 million	45	
Otis	September 11–19	185 (115)	965	None	None	None	
Max	September 13–15	150 (90)	980	Southern Mexico	$19.8 million	1	
Norma	September 14–20	120 (75)	985	Baja California Peninsula	None	None	
Lee	September 14–30	185 (115)	962	None	None	None	
Maria	September 16–30	280 (175)	908	Lesser Antilles (British Virgin Islands, Dominica, Guadeloupe, Martinique, Saint Croix), Puerto Rico, Hispaniola, Turks and Caicos Islands, The Bahamas, Southeastern United States, Mid-Atlantic States, United Kingdom, Ireland, France, Spain	$91.606 billion	3,057	
22W (Nando)	September 23–25	55 (35)	1002	Philippines, South China, Vietnam	Minimal	None	
Pilar	September 23–25	85 (50)	1000	Western Mexico	Minimal	None	

=== October ===
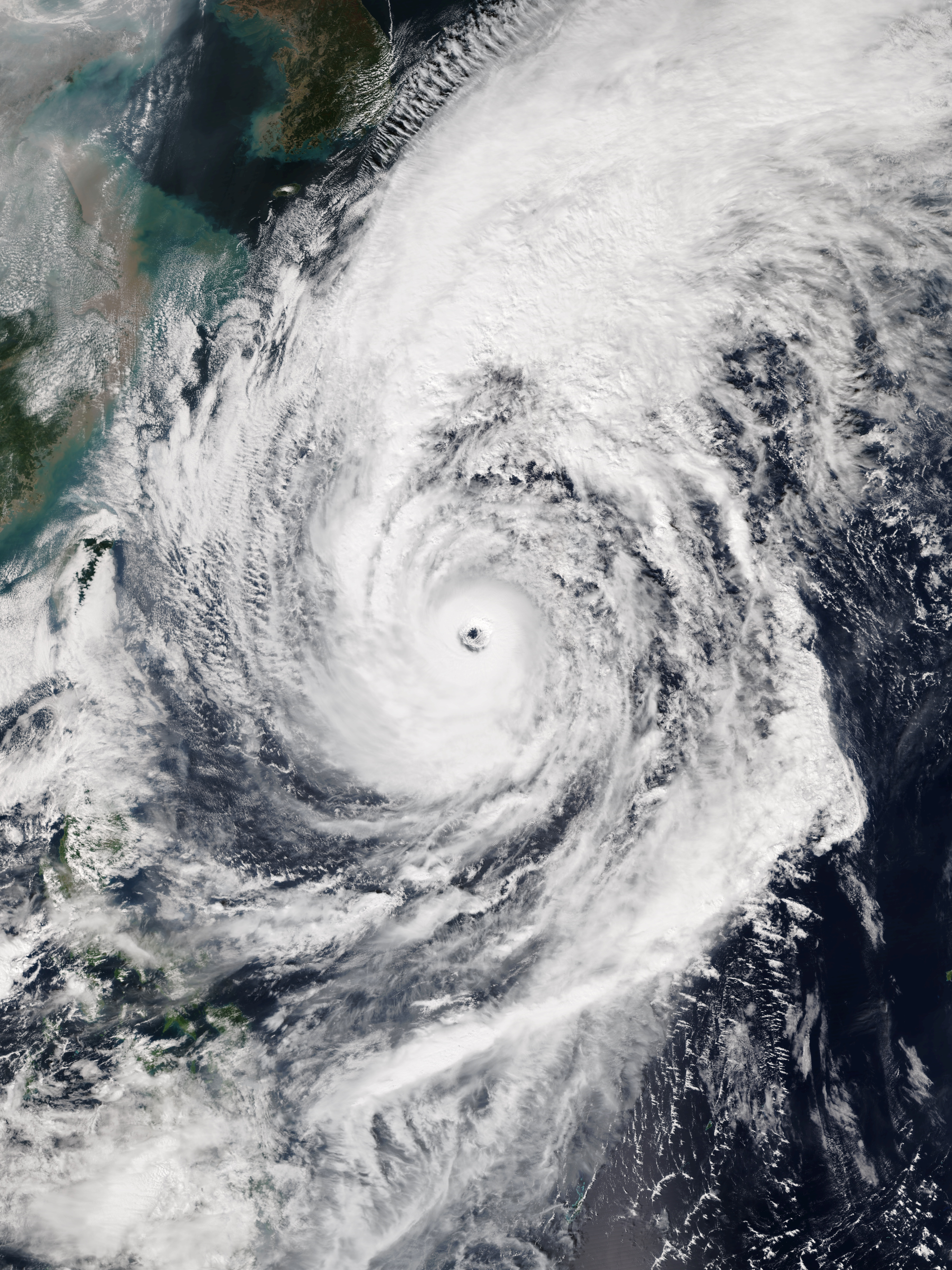
Typhoon Lan

14 cyclones existed in October 2017. The strongest tropical cyclone in this month was Typhoon Lan, which was the third most intense tropical cyclone based on central pressure. Along with Lan, Tropical Depression 23W, Tropical Depressions 26W and 29W, Tropical Storm Saola, Typhoons Khanun, and Damrey existed in the Western Pacific. In the Atlantic, Hurricanes Nate, Ophelia, as well as Tropical Storm Philippe existed during the month. In the Eastern Pacific, Tropical Storms Ramon and Selma formed during the month. In the North Indian Ocean, Land Depression 02 and Depression BOB 05 formed during the month.

Tropical cyclones formed in October 2017
Storm name	Dates active	Max wind km/h (mph)	Min pressure (mbar)	Areas affected	Damage (USD)	Deaths	Refs
Ramon	October 3–4	75 (45)	1002	Southern Mexico	None	None	
Nate	October 4–9	150 (90)	981	Central America, Cayman Islands, Cuba, Yucatán Peninsula, Gulf Coast of the United States (Louisiana, Mississippi, Alabama), East Coast of the United States, Atlantic Canada	$787 million	48	
23W	October 7–10	45 (35)	1000	Philippines, Hainan, Indochina	$602 Million	109	
LAND 02	October 9–10	45 (35)	996	Bangladesh, West Bengal, Jharkhand, Odisha, Andhra Pradesh	Unknown	7	
Ophelia	October 9–16	185 (115)	959	Azores, Portugal, Spain, France, Ireland, United Kingdom, Norway, Sweden, Finland, Estonia, and Russia	> $87.7 million	3	
Khanun (Odette)	October 11–16	175 (110)	955	Philippines, Taiwan, South China, Vietnam	$373 million	1	
Lan (Paolo)	October 15–23	250 (155)	915	Caroline Islands, Philippines, Japan, South Korea	$2 Billion	17	
26W	October 18–19	45 (30)	1002	Philippines	Minimal	14	
BOB 05	October 19–22	45 (30)	997	Odisha, West Bengal, Northeastern India, Bangladesh	Unknown	1	
Saola (Quedan)	October 22–29	120 (75)	975	Caroline Islands, Japan	$250 Million	None	
Selma	October 27–28	65 (40)	1004	El Salvador, Honduras, Nicaragua	Unknown	17	
Philippe	October 28–29	65 (40)	1000	Central America, Cayman Islands, Yucatán Peninsula, Cuba, Florida	$100 million	5	
29W	October 30 – November 7	55 (35)	1004	Vietnam, Cambodia, Thailand, Malaysia	Minimal	7	
Damrey (Ramil)	October 31 – November 4	165 (105)	970	Philippines, Vietnam, Cambodia, Thailand	$1.03 Billion	151	

=== November ===
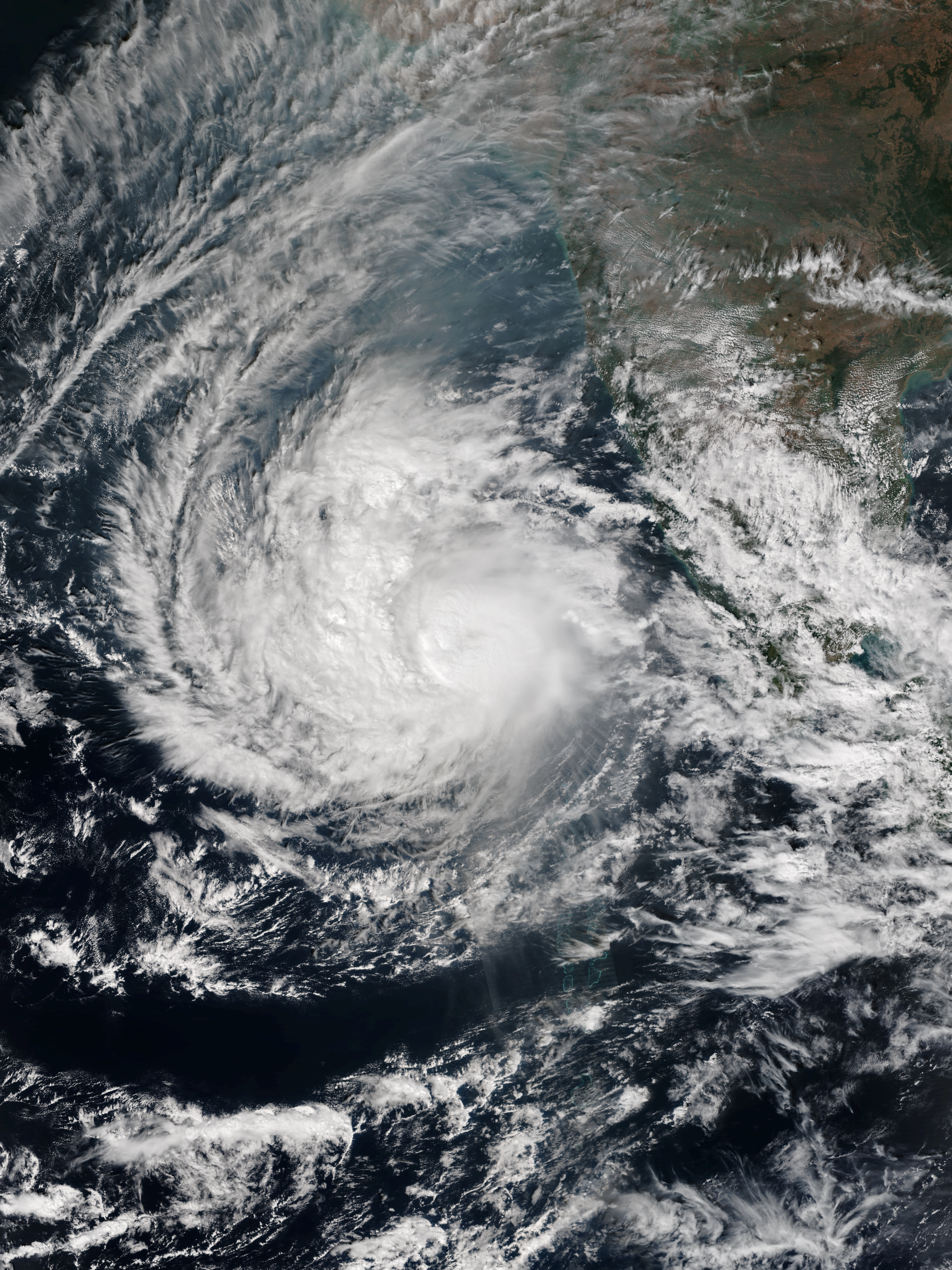
Cyclone Ockhi

8 cyclones existed in November 2017. The strongest and deadliest tropical cyclone during this month was Cyclone Ockhi, which affected Sri Lanka, India, and The Maldives, causing 318 deaths and $920 million in damages. Another cyclone that formed in the North Indian Ocean was Depression BOB 06, which also affected Eastern India. In the North Atlantic, Tropical Storm Rina existed and became the last-named storm in the basin. Its remnants eventually led to the formation of Cyclone Numa in mid-November. In the Western Pacific, Tropical Storms Haikui and Kirogi existed during the month, affecting the Philippines and Indochina. In the Australian Region, cyclones Cempaka and Dahlia affected Indonesia and existed during this month.

Tropical cyclones formed in November 2017
Storm name	Dates active	Max wind km/h (mph)	Min pressure (mbar)	Areas affected	Damage (USD)	Deaths	Refs
Rina	November 5–9	95 (60)	991	None	None	None	
Haikui (Salome)	November 7–13	75 (45)	998	Philippines, South China, Central Vietnam	$4.26 Million	None	
BOB 06	November 15–17	45 (35)	1000	Odisha, West Bengal, Andhra Pradesh	Unknown	20	
Kirogi (Tino)	November 16–19	75 (45)	1000	Philippines, Malaysia, Indochina	$10 Million	10	
Numa	November 16–20	100 (65)	995	United Kingdom, Ireland, France, Italy, Tunisia, Greece, Turkey	$100 Million	22	
Cempaka	November 22–29	65 (40)	998	Central Java, Special Region of Yogyakarta, East Java, Bali, Banten, West Java	$74 Million	41	
Dahlia	November 26 – December 4	100 (65)	985	Sumatra, Java	None	None	
Ockhi	November 29 – December 6	185 (115)	976	Sri Lanka, India, Maldives	$920 Million	318	

=== December ===
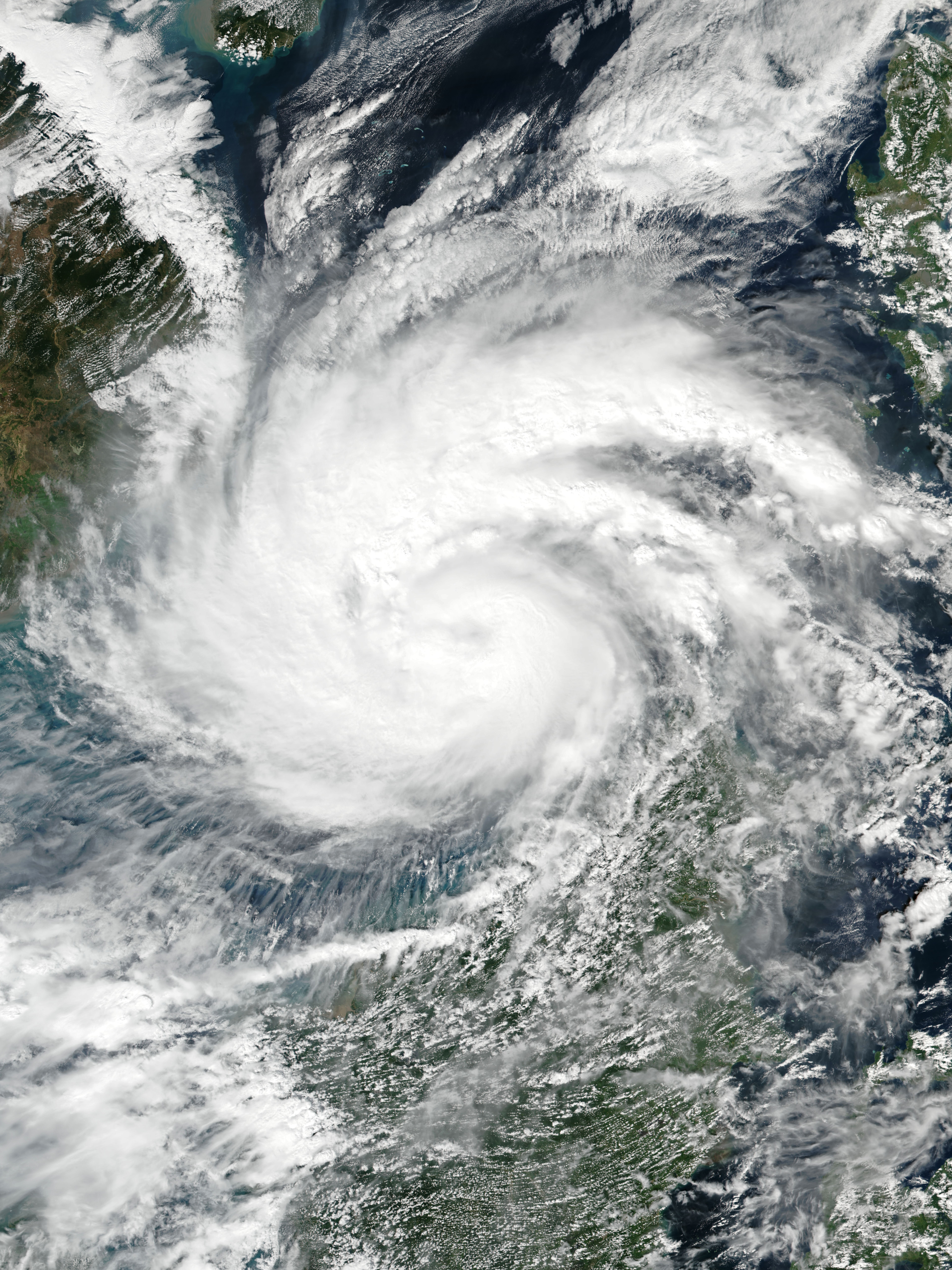
Typhoon Tembin

During the month of December, 11 systems formed within their respective basins. The strongest tropical cyclone of this month is Cyclone Ava, which brought devastating impacts to Eastern Madagascar. The costliest and deadliest tropical cyclones of this month were Typhoon Tembin and Tropical Storm Kai-tak, both of which affected the Caroline Islands, Philippines, Malaysia, and Vietnam throughout their existence. Other tropical cyclones from this month include Tropical Storm Bolaven, which existed throughout January 2018, Cyclone Guará in the South Atlantic, Cyclone Hilda and Tropical Low 05U in the Australian Region, BOB 08 in the North Indian Ocean, and three tropical depressions in the South Pacific.

Tropical cyclones formed in December 2017
Storm name	Dates active	Max wind km/h (mph)	Min pressure (mbar)	Areas affected	Damage (USD)	Deaths	Refs
05U	December 1–2	Unspecified	Not specified	None	None	None	
BOB 08	December 6–9	55 (35)	1002	Southern Thailand, Northern Malaysia, Aceh, Andaman and Nicobar Islands, Odisha, West Bengal, Bangladesh	Unknown	20	
Guará	December 9–11	75 (45)	996	Brazil	None	None	
Kai-tak (Urduja)	December 13–23	75 (45)	995	Caroline Islands, Philippines, Malaysia	>74.3 million	83	
02F	December 16–18	Not specified	1003	None	None	None	
03F	December 17–19	Not specified	1000	None	None	None	
04F	December 20–26	Not specified	998	Fiji	None	None	
Tembin (Vinta)	December 20–26	130 (80)	970	Caroline Islands, Philippines, Malaysia, Vietnam	>42 million	266	
Hilda	December 26–29	100 (65)	980	Western Australia	Minimal	None	
Ava	December 27 – January 9	155 (100)	965	Madagascar	$4.62 million	73	
Bolaven (Agaton)	December 29 – January 4	65 (40)	1002	Caroline Islands, Philippines, Vietnam	$11.1 million	3	

== Global effects ==
Season name	Areas affected	Systems formed	Named systems	Damage (USD)	Deaths
2017 Atlantic hurricane season	Guyana, Venezuela, Trinidad and Tobago, Windward Islands, Honduras, Belize, Cayman Islands, Mexico, Cuba, United States, Barbados, Nicaragua, Bermuda, Suriname, Jamaica, Atlantic Canada, Cape Verde, Leeward Islands, Puerto Rico, Hispaniola, Turks and Caicos, The Bahamas, United Kingdom, Ireland, France, Spain, Costa Rica, El Salvador, Panama, Azores, Portugal, Norway, Sweden, Finland, Estonia, Russia	18	17	≥$294.92 billion	3,364
2017 Mediterranean tropical cyclone season	United Kingdom, Ireland, France, Italy, Tunisia, Greece, Turkey	1	1	$100 million	22
2017 South Atlantic tropical cyclone	Brazil	1	1	$0	None
2017 Pacific hurricane season	Mexico, Guatemala, Baja California Peninsula, California, Arizona, Nicaragua, Costa Rica, El Salvador, Honduras	20	18	$375.28 million	45
2017 Pacific typhoon season ^{1}	Philippines, Vietnam, Cambodia, Malaysia, Taiwan, Japan, China, Ryukyu Islands, Mariana Islands, Bangladesh, Ogasawara Islands, Caroline Islands, Thailand	41	27	$14.3 billion	860
2017 North Indian Ocean cyclone season	Myanmar, Andaman and Nicobar Islands, India, Thailand, Sri Lanka, Maldives, Malaysia, Aceh, China, Bangladesh, Bhutan	10	3	>$3.65 billion	834
2016–17 South-West Indian Ocean cyclone season ^{1}	Réunion, Mauritius, Mozambique, South Africa, Zimbabwe, Botswana, Malawi, Madagascar, Rodrigues	5	4	$236.5 million	376
2017–18 South-West Indian Ocean cyclone season ^{2}	Madagascar, Réunion, Mauritius, Mozambique	2	1	$4.62 million	73
2016–17 Australian region cyclone season ^{1}	Northern Territory, Western Australia, Cocos Islands, Christmas Island, Queensland, New Caledonia, New South Wales, New Zealand, New Guinea, Maluku, Timor	22	8	$2.82 billion	16
2017–18 Australian region cyclone season ^{2}	Java, Sumatra, Indonesia, Western Australia	6	3	$83.6 million	41
2016–17 South Pacific cyclone season ^{1}	Solomon Islands, Vanuatu, Fiji, New Caledonia, New Zealand, Southern Cook Islands, Tonga, Samoa, American Samoa, Wallis and Futuna	17	4	$43 million	3
2017–18 South Pacific cyclone season ^{2}	Fiji, New Caledonia, New Zealand, Wallis and Futuna, Samoan Islands, Tonga, Vanuatu, Rotuma	3	0	$285 million	11
Worldwide	(See above)	146	87	> $321.44 billion	5,645

== See also ==
- Weather of 2017
- Tropical cyclones by year
- List of earthquakes in 2017
- Tornadoes of 2017
- 2017 wildfire season

== Notes ==
^{1} Only systems that formed either on or after January 1, 2017 are counted in the seasonal totals.
^{2} Only systems that formed either before or on December 31, 2017 are counted in the seasonal totals.
^{3} The wind speeds for this tropical cyclone are based on the IMD Scale which uses 3-minute sustained winds.
^{4} The wind speeds for this tropical cyclone are based on the Saffir Simpson Scale which uses 1-minute sustained winds.
