= Tropical Storm Merbok (2017) =

Pacific severe tropical storm in 2017

Severe Tropical Storm Merbok
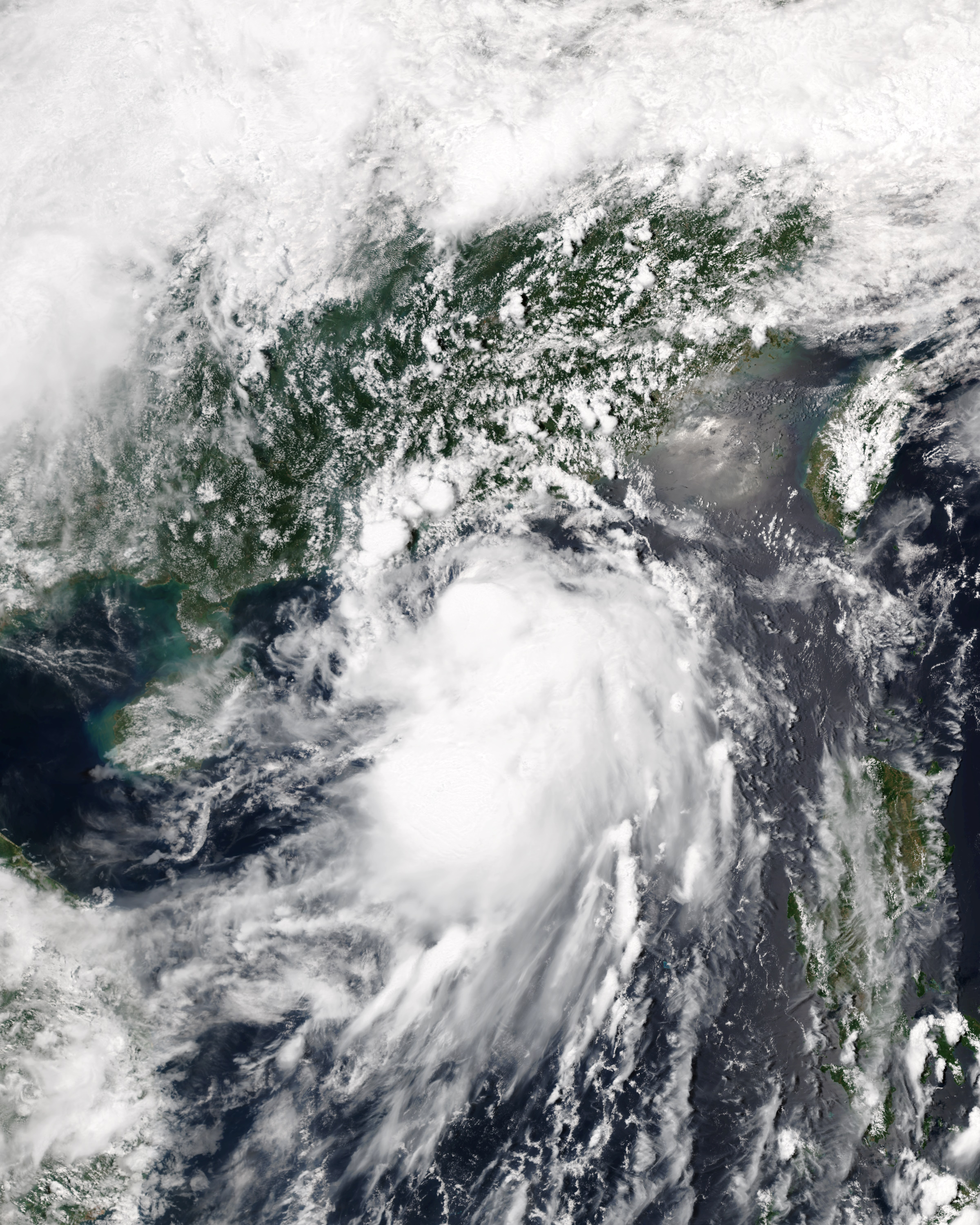
- Severe Tropical Storm Merbok nearing landfall in China on June 12

Meteorological history
- Formed: June 10, 2017
- Dissipated: June 13, 2017

Severe tropical storm
- 10-minute sustained (JMA)
- Highest winds: 100 km/h (65 mph)
- Lowest pressure: 985 hPa (mbar); 29.09 inHg

Tropical storm
- 1-minute sustained (SSHWS/JTWC)
- Highest winds: 85 km/h (50 mph)
- Lowest pressure: 989 hPa (mbar); 29.21 inHg

Overall effects
- Fatalities: None reported
- Damage: $88.3 million (2017 USD)
- Areas affected: Philippines, South China
- IBTrACS
- Part of the 2017 Pacific typhoon season

Severe Tropical Storm Merbok (Note: The name Merbok (Malay: merbok, [mərbok]) was contributed by Malaysia and refers to the zebra dove (Geopelia striata) in Malay.) was a weak tropical cyclone that brought significant impacts to southern China in mid-June 2017. Merbok developed out of a tropical depression which was first monitored by the JMA while it was west of Manila, Philippines, on June 10. The system would later be named 04W by the JTWC. The depression then strengthened into Tropical Storm Merbok before making landfall in eastern Shenzhen, China. Merbok would rapidly weaken inland, dissipating over Southern China on June 13.

Merbok caused tropical storm-force winds in Hong Kong, as the center of the storm passed nearby. Merbok also caused property damage and agricultural damage across Guangdong Province. Total economic losses from Merbok were estimated to be CN¥600 million (US$88.3 million).

== Meteorological history ==
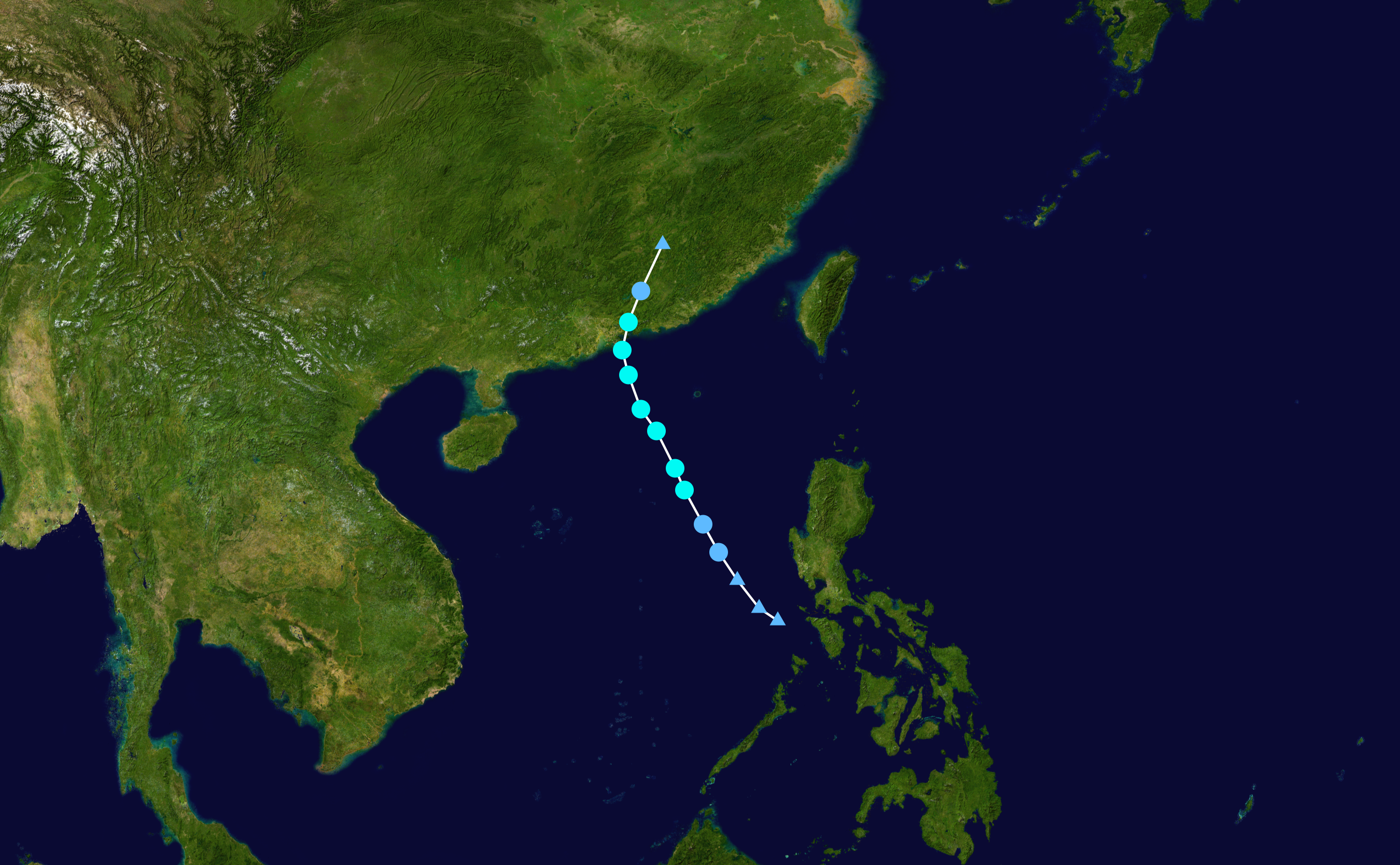
Map plotting the storm's track and intensity, according to the Saffir–Simpson scale Map key Saffir–Simpson scale Tropical depression (≤38 mph, ≤62 km/h) Tropical storm (39–73 mph, 63–118 km/h) Category 1 (74–95 mph, 119–153 km/h) Category 2 (96–110 mph, 154–177 km/h) Category 3 (111–129 mph, 178–208 km/h) Category 4 (130–156 mph, 209–251 km/h) Category 5 (≥157 mph, ≥252 km/h) Unknown Storm type Tropical cyclone Subtropical cyclone Extratropical cyclone, remnant low, tropical disturbance, or monsoon depression

On June 9 at 06:00 UTC, the Joint Typhoon Warning Center (JTWC) began monitoring an area of convection approximately 195 nautical miles (360 km; 225 mi) south of Manila, with the JTWC assessing its development potential within the next day as low. The system was in a marginal environment for development, with satellite imagery showing scattered convection around a poorly organized circulation. By June 10, conditions began to improve and the system began to organize, with the JTWC upgrading its development potential within the next day to medium. On the same day at 06:00 UTC, the Japan Meteorological Agency (JMA) began issuing advisories on a tropical depression. At 15:00 UTC, the JTWC issued a Tropical Cyclone Formation Alert on the system as it was located approximately 185 nautical miles (345 km; 215 mi) west-northwest of Manila. At this time, the system was located within favorable conditions for further development, though its circulation still remained broad. On June 11 at 03:00 UTC, the JTWC issued its first warning on Tropical Depression 04W as it continued to organize, with cloud tops in the central dense overcast deepening.

Shortly after at 06:00 UTC, the JMA upgraded the depression to a tropical storm, giving it the name Merbok. Advanced Scatterometer data from the MetOp-B satellite at 13:14 UTC showed tropical-storm-force winds in the eastern quadrants of the storm, and at 15:00 UTC, the JTWC also upgraded Merbok to a tropical storm. Merbok continued tracking to the north-northwest influenced by a subtropical steering ridge, and on June 12 at 12:00 UTC, the JMA upgraded Merbok to a severe tropical storm. At the same time, Merbok peaked in intensity, with 10-min winds of 55 knots (100 km/h; 65 mph) and a minimum central pressure of 985 hPa (mbar; 29.09 inHg). The JTWC estimated peak 1-min winds of 45 knots (85 km/h; 50 mph). Merbok made landfall on the city of Shenzhen at 14-15:00 UTC, resulting in the JMA downgrading it to a tropical storm at 18:00 UTC and the JTWC issuing its final advisory on Merbok at 21:00 UTC. The JMA later issued its final advisory on the system on the next day at 00:00 UTC as it weakened into a tropical depression, with its remnants dissipating inland at 12:00 UTC.

== Preparations and impact ==
=== Hong Kong ===
A Signal No. 1 warning was put in place for Hong Kong when Merbok first formed. This was upgraded to a Signal No. 8 warning by the time the storm made landfall.

10 people were injured in Hong Kong due to Merbok. During the storm's passage there were 600 reports of fallen trees, 20 reports of flooding, and 2 reports of landslides. An aluminum window fell off a building in To Kwa Wan, damaging two cars beneath it. Numerous roads were flooded causing major traffic issues on the morning of June 13. A retaining wall along Tai Tam Road in Stanley collapsed due to the heavy rainfall produced by Merbok. Over 500 flights at the Hong Kong International Airport were affected by the storm.

=== China ===
A blue alert was issued as Merbok approached China on June 12.

Across Guangdong Province, 32 homes were destroyed, 122,000 people reported property damage, 13,000 hectares of crops flooded, and roughly 155,000 households lost electricity. Total economic losses in South China were counted to be CN¥600 million (US$88.3 million).

== See also ==
- Weather of 2017
- Tropical cyclones in 2017
- Tropical Storm Mekkhala (2020)
