= 2017 North Indian Ocean cyclone season =

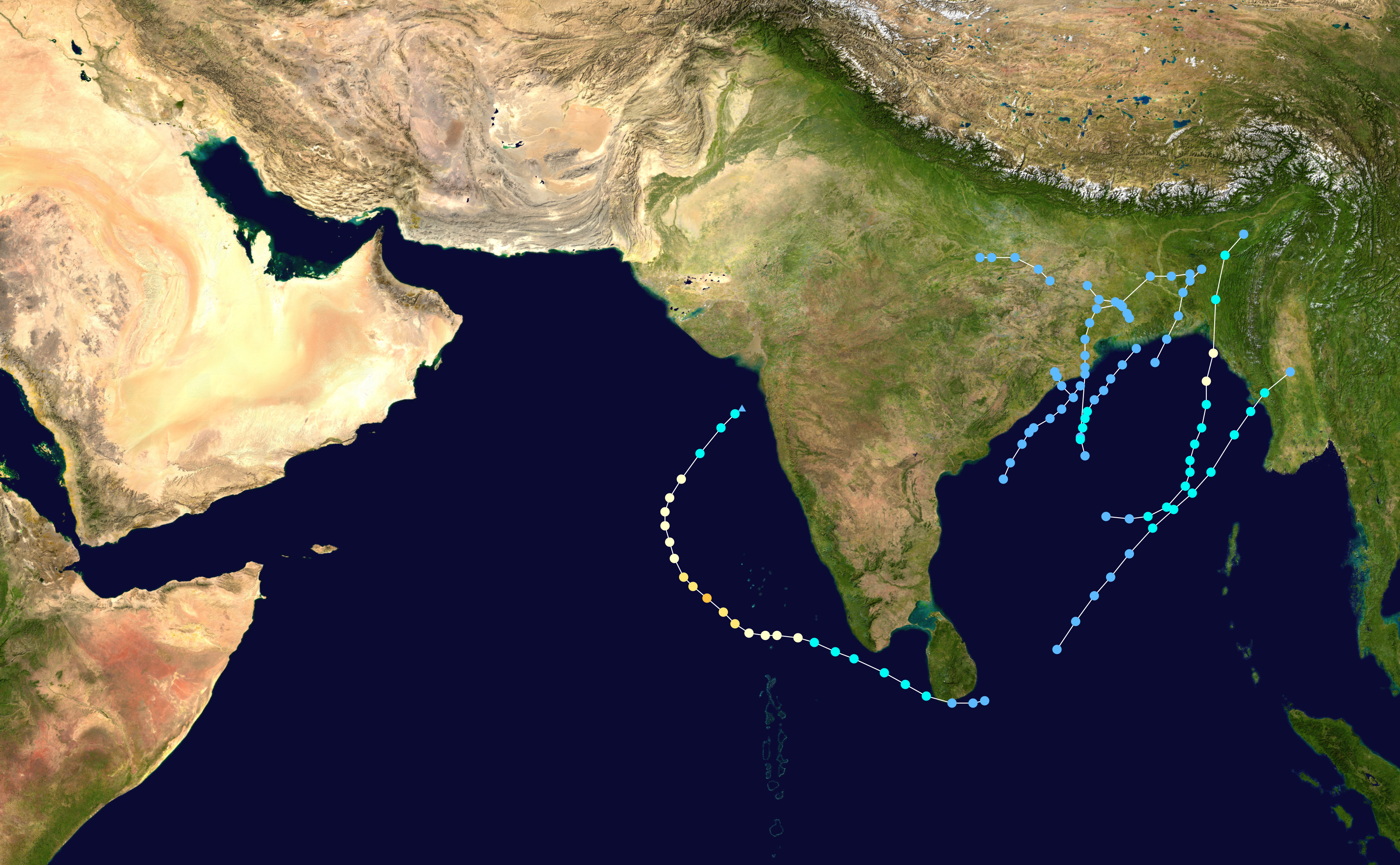
- Season summary map

Seasonal boundaries
- First system formed: April 15, 2017
- Last system dissipated: December 9, 2017

Strongest storm
- Name: Ockhi
  - Maximum winds: 155 km/h (100 mph) (3-minute sustained)
  - Lowest pressure: 976 hPa (mbar)

Seasonal statistics
- Depressions: 10
- Deep depressions: 6
- Cyclonic storms: 3
- Severe cyclonic storms: 2
- Very severe cyclonic storms: 1
- Super cyclonic storms: 0
- Total fatalities: 834 total
- Total damage: $3.65 billion (2017 USD)

Related articles
- 2017 Atlantic hurricane season; 2017 Pacific hurricane season; 2017 Pacific typhoon season

The 2017 North Indian Ocean cyclone season was a below average yet deadly season in the annual cycle of tropical cyclone formation. This season produced only three named storms, of which one only intensified into a very severe cyclonic storm. The North Indian Ocean cyclone season has no official bounds but cyclones tend to form between April and December with the two peaks in May and November. These dates conventionally delimit the period of each year when most tropical cyclones form in the northern Indian Ocean. The season began with the formation of Cyclone Maarutha on April 15 and ended with the dissipation of a deep depression on December 9.

The scope of this article is limited to the Indian Ocean in the Northern Hemisphere, east of the Horn of Africa and west of the Malay Peninsula. There are two main seas in the North Indian Ocean – the Arabian Sea to the west of the Indian subcontinent, abbreviated ARB by the India Meteorological Department (IMD); and the Bay of Bengal to the east, abbreviated BOB by the IMD. The systems that form over land are abbreviated as LAND. The official Regional Specialized Meteorological Centre in this basin is the IMD, while the Joint Typhoon Warning Center (JTWC) releases unofficial advisories. On average, three to four cyclonic storms form in this basin every season.

== Season summary ==
The season began prematurely, with the formation of Cyclone Maarutha over the Bay of Bengal in mid-April. In May, Cyclone Mora formed over the Bay of Bengal. At its peak, it was equivalent to a marginal Category 1 hurricane on the Saffir–Simpson hurricane wind scale. Mora would produce flash flooding throughout Sri Lanka, India, Myanmar and Bangladesh and caused 15 deaths directly and 208 deaths indirectly. The floods persisted in Bangladesh since a Deep Depression over Bay of Bengal made landfall and killed 156 people in Bangladesh. A depression formed in northwestern Bay of Bengal and produced torrential rainfall. It was followed by a depression over Jharkhand which killed 70 people in West Bengal. Under the influence of strong monsoon surge a disturbance developed over Bay of Bengal travelled westwards and intensified to an unnamed depression. It also affected neighboring Karachi in Pakistan. A strong monsoon surge prevented formation of systems until a deep depression formed over West Bengal in October and caused heavy rainfall. A couple of depressions formed between mid-October and November which continued the rain spell causing destruction of life and property. Very Severe Cyclonic Storm Ockhi formed in early December and wreaked havoc in the countries where it impacted. It was equivalent to a strong Category 3 hurricane on the Saffir–Simpson scale at peak intensity. The twin storm of Ockhi was a deep depression which originated in Bay of Bengal while its counterpart was in Arabian Sea.

== Systems ==
=== Cyclonic Storm Maarutha ===
- Cyclonic storm (IMD)
- Tropical storm (SSHWS)
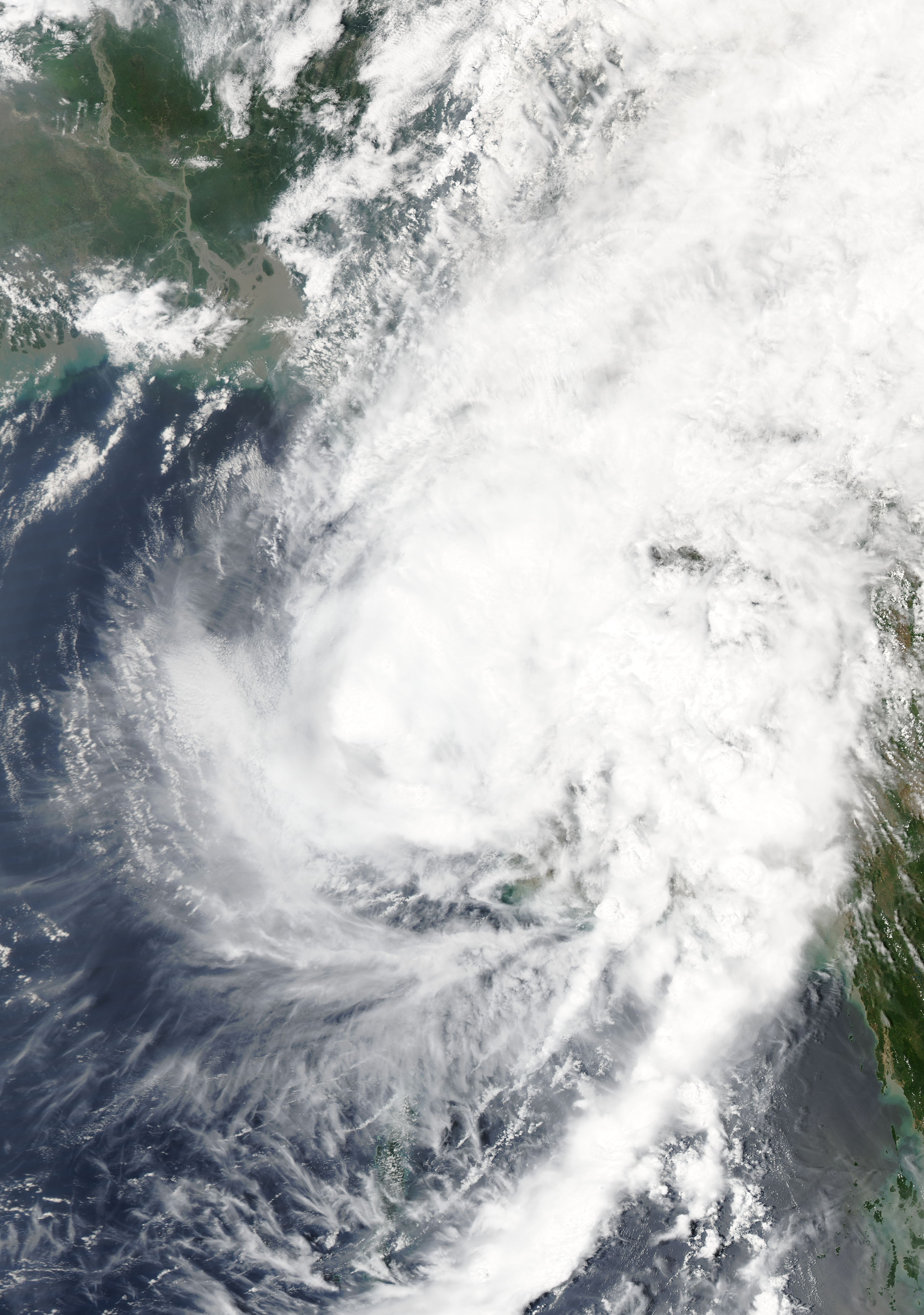
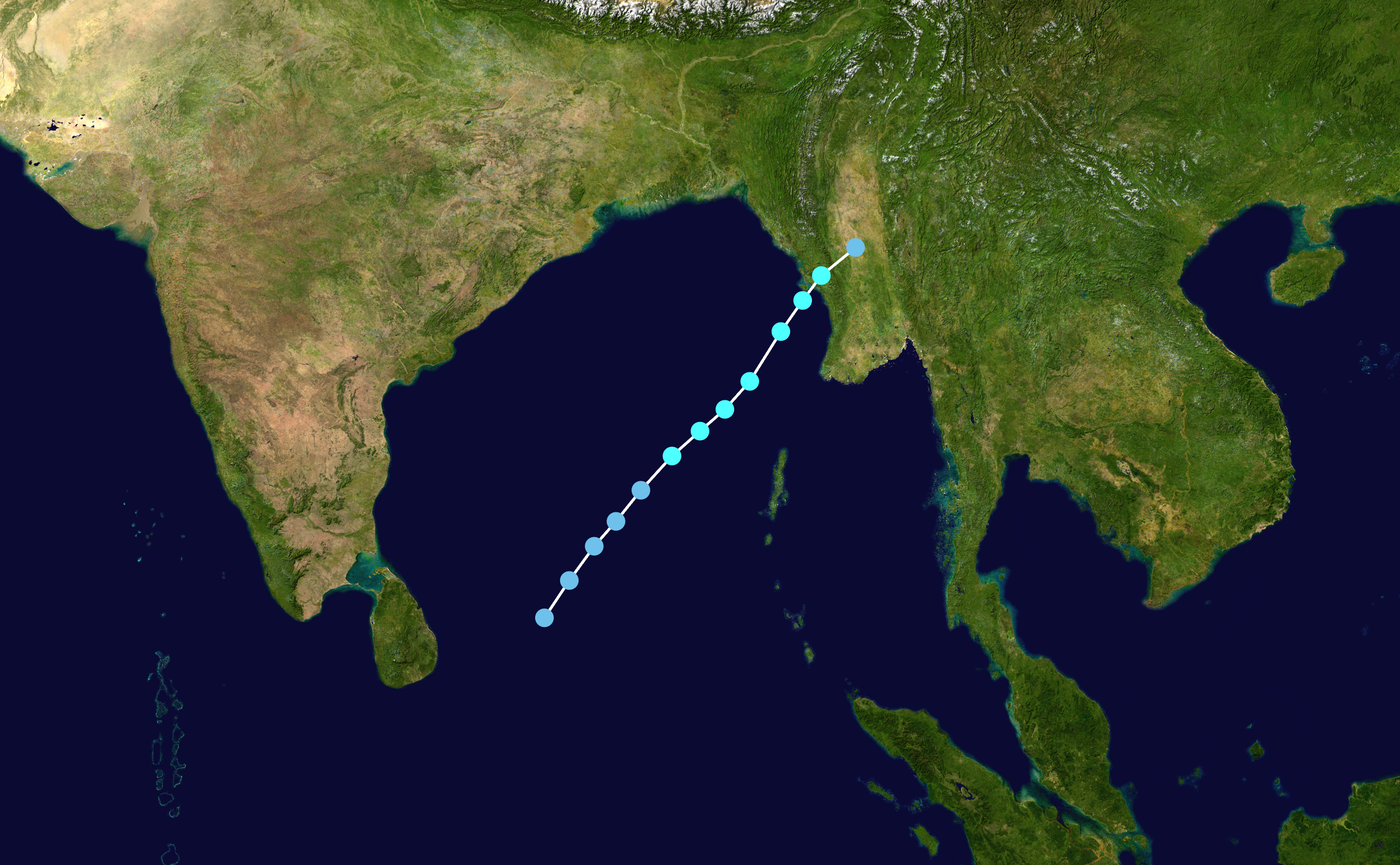
- Duration: April 15 – April 17
- Peak intensity: 75 km/h (45 mph) (3-min); 996 hPa (mbar)

On April 13, an area of low pressure formed in the South Bay of Bengal, under the influence of a persistent area of convection, in a span of six hours. Under favorable conditions, rapid deepening took place, and the system was classified as a depression on April 15. Later on the same day, it further intensified into a Deep Depression, and then into Cyclonic Storm Maarutha. (Note: The name Maarutha (Sinhala: මාරුත, [maːruta]) was contributed by Sri Lanka and means "wind, gale, air" in Sinhala.) The system moved very fast under the influence of mid-latitude trough in westerlies lying over India in the middle and upper tropospheric levels. However, strong vertical wind shear and unfavourable MJO inhibited rapid intensification or further intensification of the system. Moving northeastwards, it reached its peak intensity in the early hours of 16th. The system maintained its peak intensity till landfall near Sandoway (Thandwe) in Myanmar in the midnight. After landfall, the system weakened into a Deep Depression in early hours of 17th, into a Depression in the morning and well marked low-pressure area over central Myanmar and neighbourhood in the forenoon of 17th.

Maarutha had already triggered heavy rainfall as a depression in Sri Lanka, as well as the Andaman and Nicobar Islands (India). Due to a heavy swell in the sea around the Andaman Islands, all ferries to Havelock Island from Port Blair were suspended on leaving nearly 1,500 tourists stranded. In Kyaukpyu, Maarutha destroyed more than 81 households and total damages amounted to Ks31.8 million (US$23,400) as of April 18. Four people were reported to be killed in the Irrawady division of Myanmar. Maarutha developed as a depression in the first fortnight of April. Climatologically, the formation of tropical cyclones in the Bay of Bengal at this time of the year is rare. Only twelve Cyclonic Storms have developed over the Bay of Bengal this early in the year between 1891 and 2014.

=== Severe Cyclonic Storm Mora ===
- Severe cyclonic storm (IMD)
- Category 1 tropical cyclone (SSHWS)
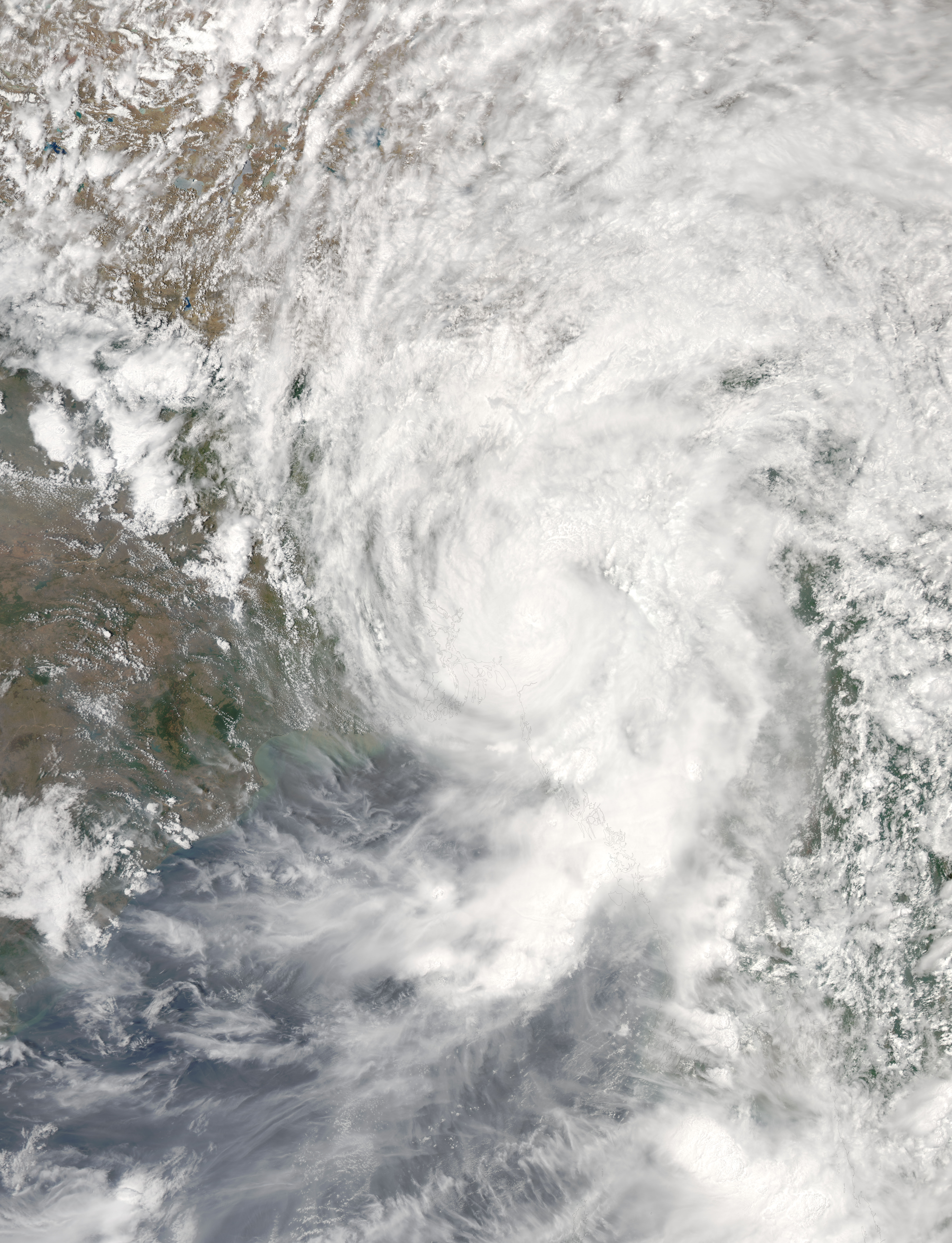
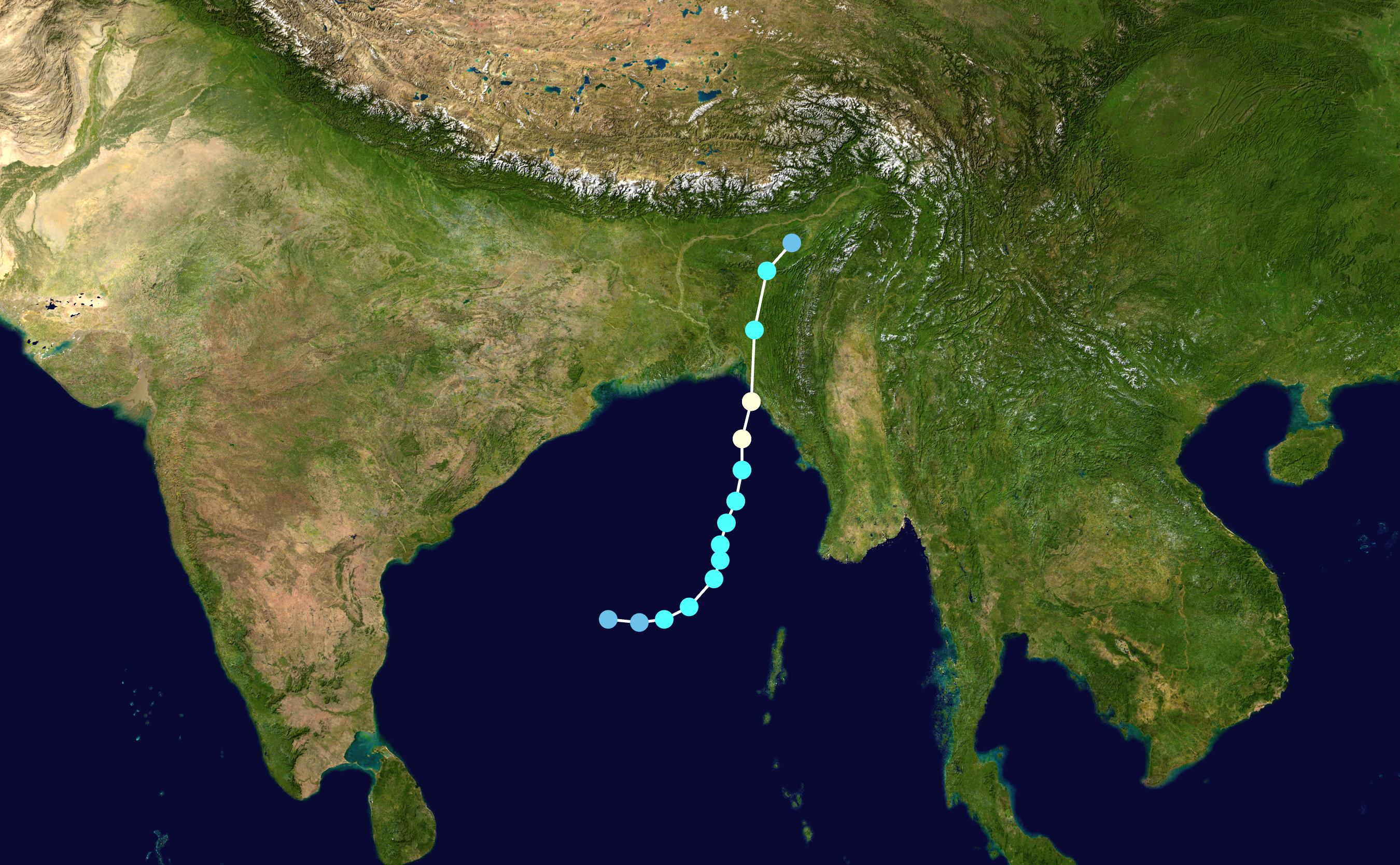
- Duration: May 28 – May 31
- Peak intensity: 110 km/h (70 mph) (3-min); 978 hPa (mbar)

Under the influence of a persistent area of convection, a low-pressure area formed over the southeast Bay of Bengal on May 26. It rapidly strengthened on May 28, with the IMD classifying it as a Depression and subsequently upgrading it to a Deep Depression on the same day, designating it as BOB 02. In the early hours of May 29, the IMD reported the storm to have reached cyclonic storm intensity, naming it Mora. (Note: The name Mora (Thai: โมรา, [moː˧ raː˧]) was contributed by Thailand and means "agate" in Thai.) The storm followed a north-northeasterly track parallel to Myanmar coast. The system moved fast under the influence of mid-latitude trough in westerlies lying over India in the middle and upper tropospheric levels and the anti-cyclonic cyclonic circulation lying to the northeast of the system. Shortly before landfall, the storm reached its peak intensity as a severe cyclonic storm with winds of 110 km/h and a minimum central pressure off 978 hPa (28.9 inHg). The JTWC analyzed it having reached Category 1 hurricane strength on the same day, with winds of 120 km/h. At peak intensity, the storm made landfall on the southern coast of Bangladesh near Chittagong at 6:00 a.m. IST. After landfall, the storm steadily weakened due to land interaction, before weakening into a well-marked low-pressure area over Nagaland on May 31.

A total of 31 people have been killed—9 in Bangladesh and 1 in Myanmar and 19 in Manipur Damage throughout all the affected countries totalled almost US$1.37 billion. Two people were reported killed in Malda district of West Bengal.

Additionally, although not directly related to the storm, the precursor low of Mora strengthened the arrival of the monsoon, which caused heavy flooding in Sri Lanka and the Andaman Islands that killed 208 people.

=== Deep Depression BOB 03 ===
- Deep depression (IMD)
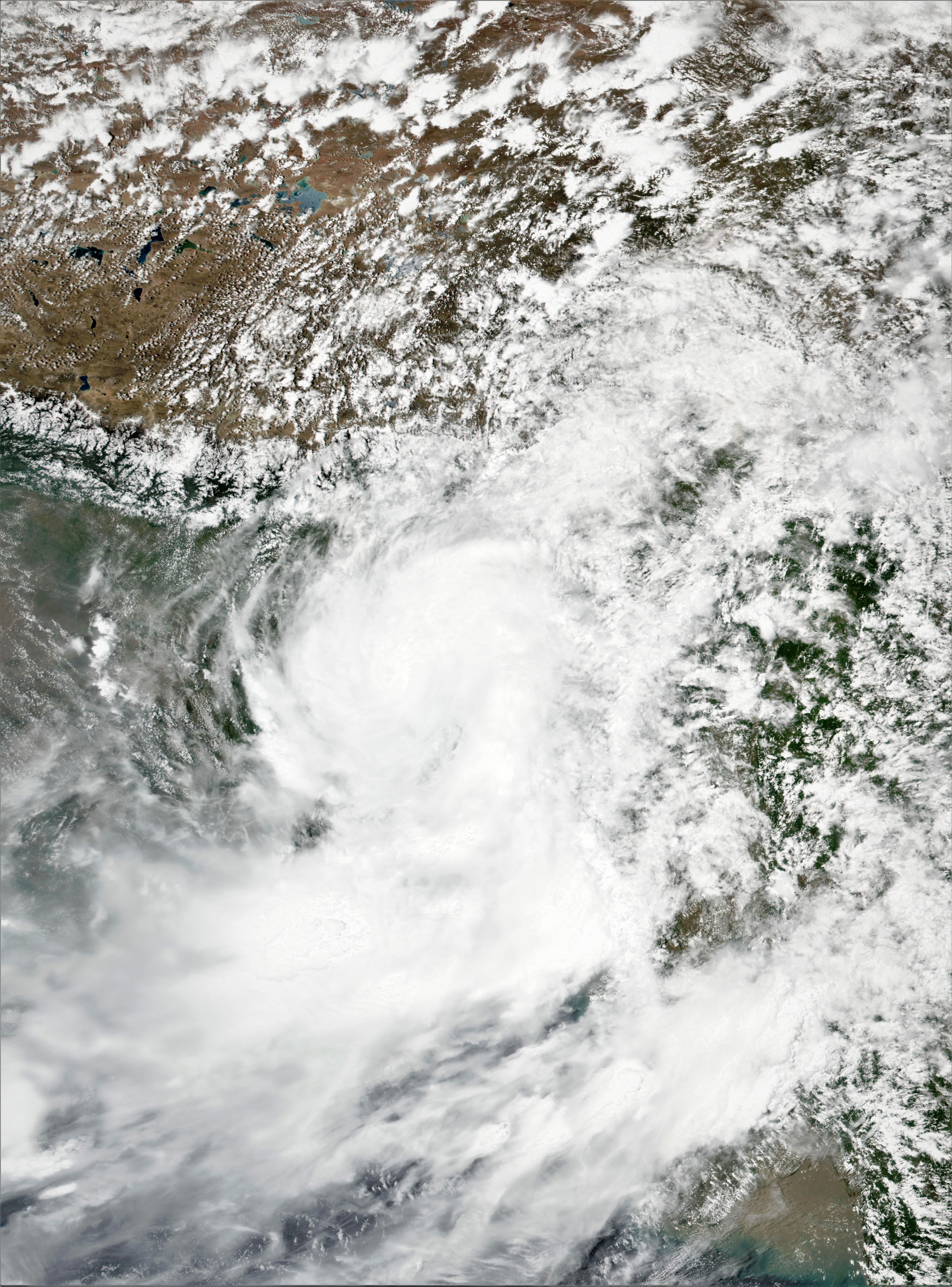
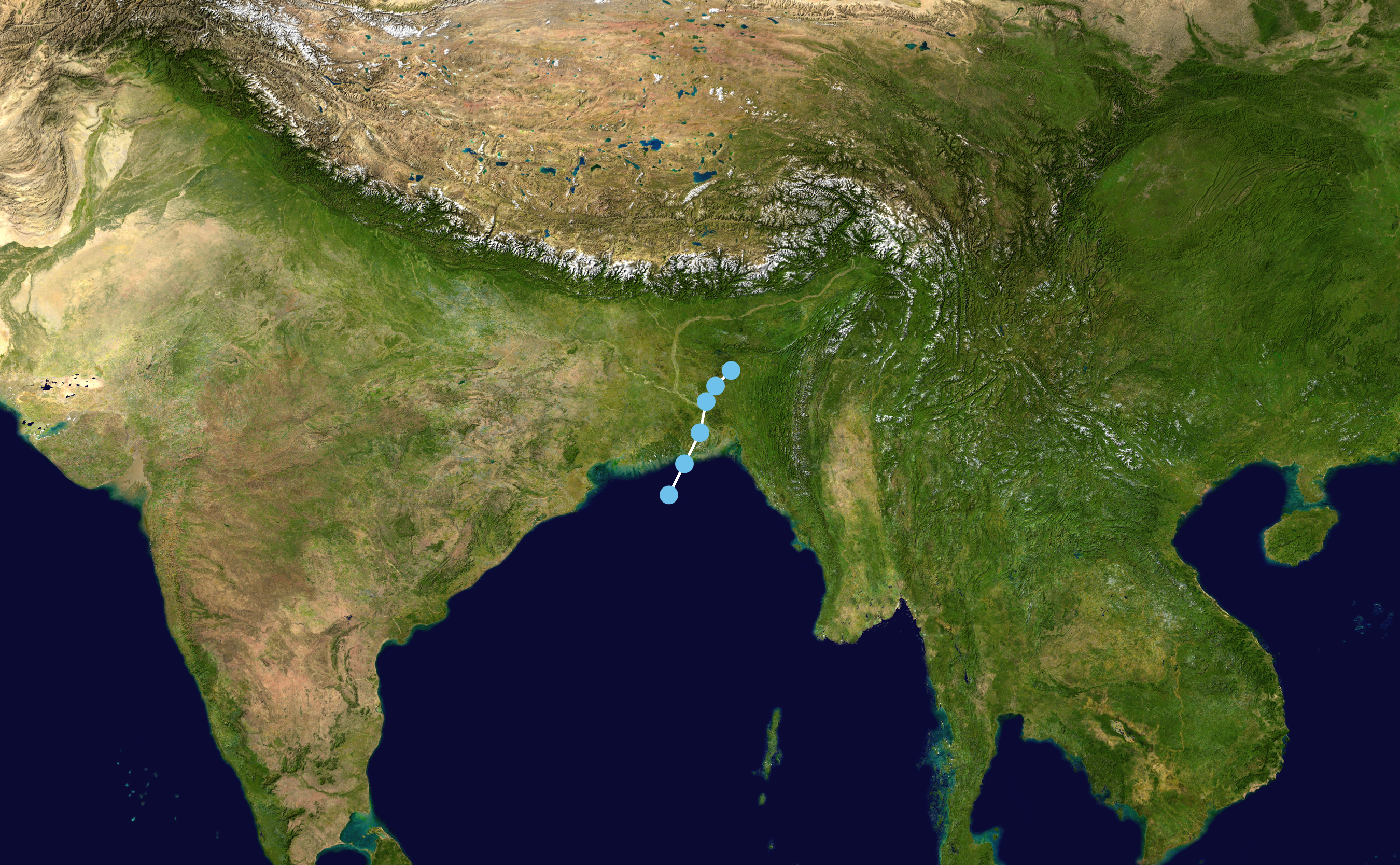
- Duration: June 11 – June 13
- Peak intensity: 55 km/h (35 mph) (3-min); 988 hPa (mbar)

A low-pressure area formed over west central & adjoining north Bay of Bengal off north Andhra Pradesh south Odisha coast in the morning of June 10. It concentrated into a well marked low-pressure area over northern parts of central Bay of Bengal & adjoining north Bay of Bay on 11th morning and into a depression over north Bay of Bengal in the evening of 11th.). An anti-cyclonic circulation lay to the southeast of the system centre leading to poleward outflow favouring genesis of the system. Moving nearly north-northeastwards, it intensified into a deep depression over north Bay of Bengal in the night of 11th (1800 UTC)and peaked with estimated 3-minute sustained windspeeds of 55 km/h (35 mph). Moving north-northeastwards, it crossed Bangladesh coast near Khepupara between 2300 UTC of 11th and 0000 UTC of June 12. As the system moved over land, it weakened gradually into a depression over east Bangladesh & neighbourhood due to land surface interaction and thereafter into a well marked low-pressure area.

At least 156 people have been confirmed dead following landslides caused in the Rangamati, Bandarban and Chittagong districts of Bangladesh along with 14 others in Northeast India caused by torrential rainfall. Cherrapunji received 320 mm rain in association with the system. The system helped in the advancement of monsoon over the regions of West Bengal and Odisha. Damages included loss of Tk 18 billion (US$223 million).

=== Depression BOB 04 ===
- Depression (IMD)
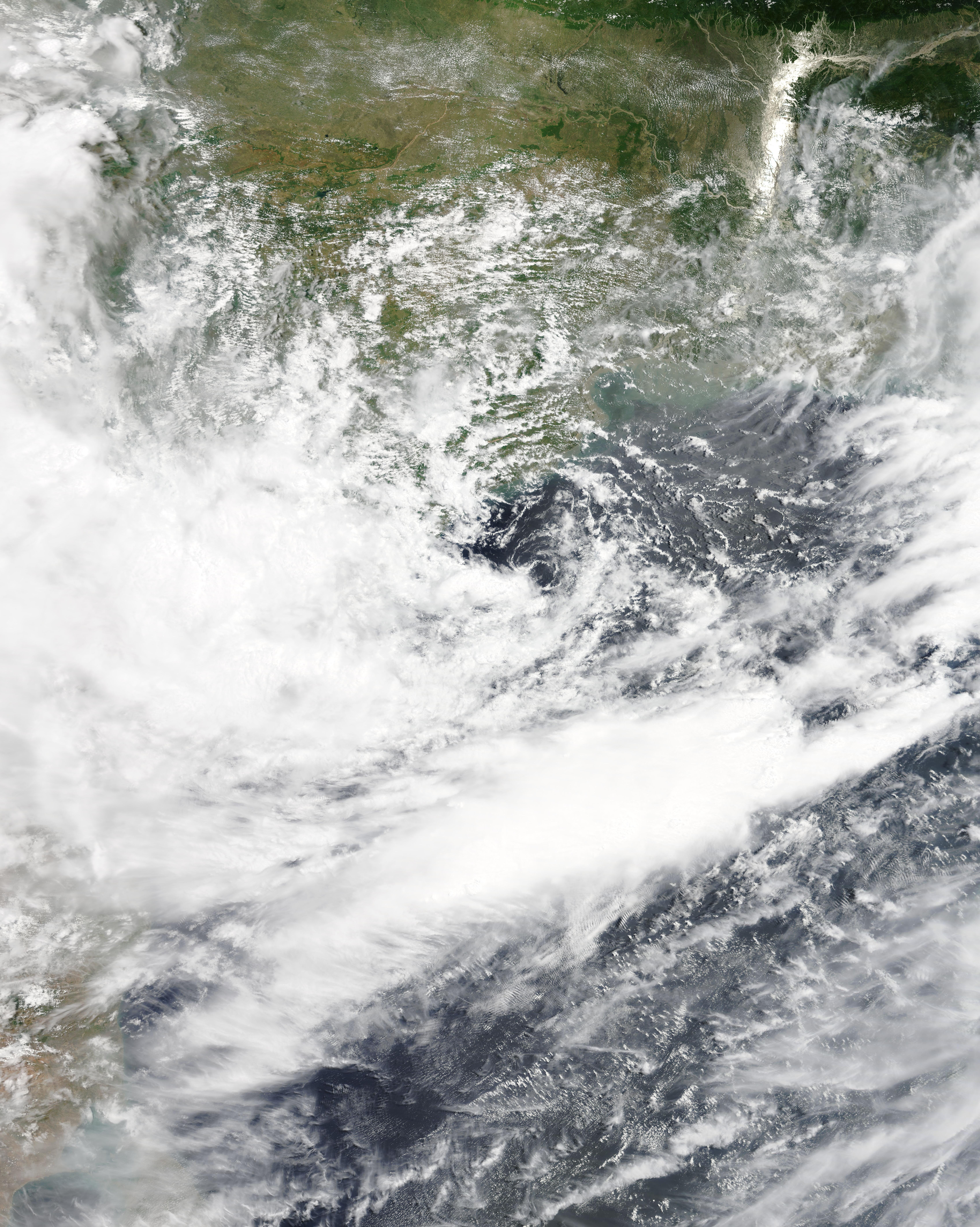
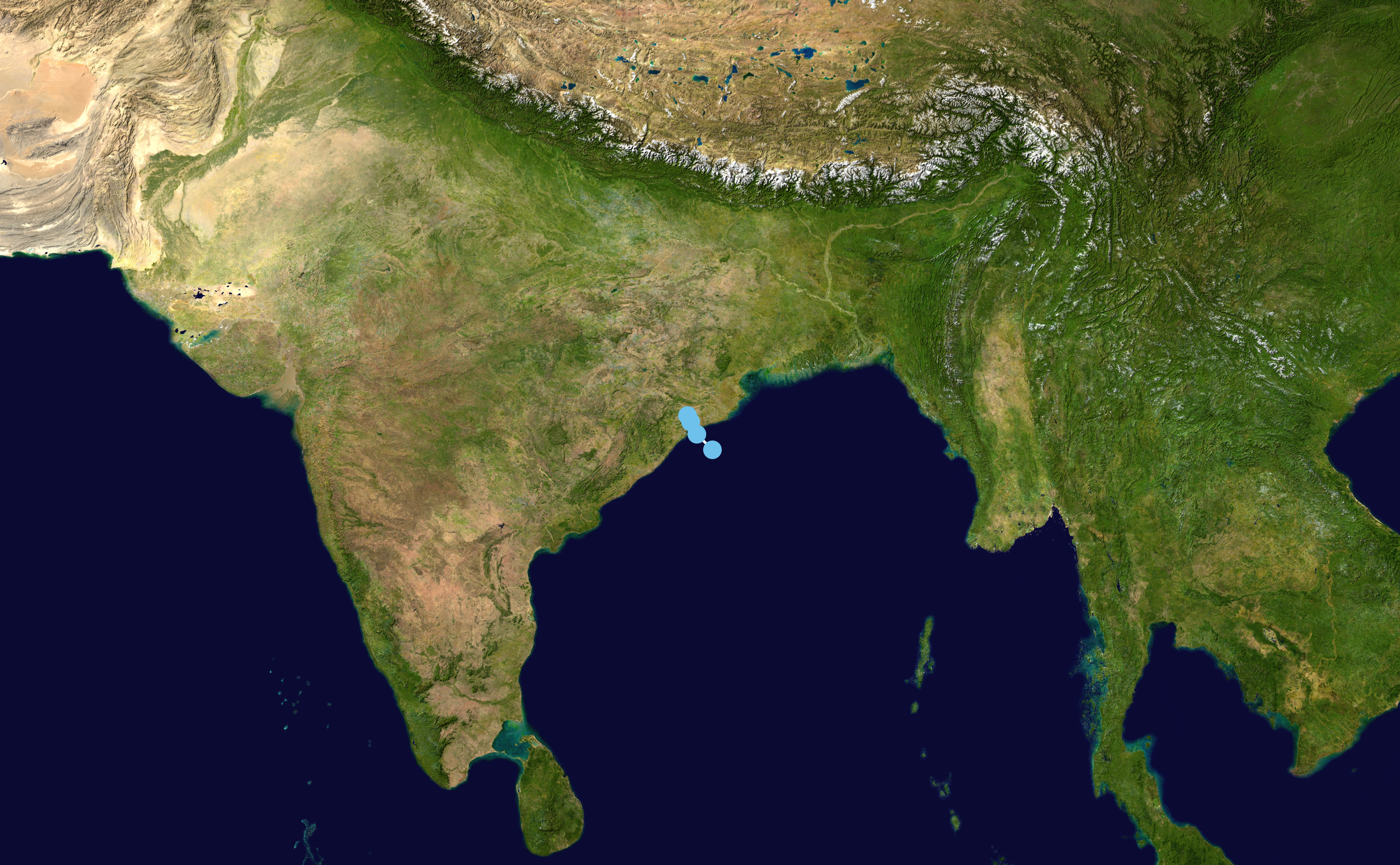
- Duration: July 18 – July 19
- Peak intensity: 45 km/h (30 mph) (3-min); 992 hPa (mbar)

A low-pressure area consolidated into a depression over the northwestern and adjoining west-central Bay of Bengal, off the Odisha coast on July 17. The IMD began issuing advisories on the depression, which was very likely to cross the coast by night. The depression moved in a generally northwestwards direction without intensifying, and made landfall on India's Odisha coast, south of Puri, at about 15:00 UTC (20:30 IST) on July 18. Heavy rainfall peaking at Dondilohara in Chhattisgarh receiving 270 mm (11 in) and Dabubagan in Odisha receiving 200 mm (7.9 in) in 24 hours, along with sustained winds of 45 km/h (30 mph) affected the region, causing at least a dozen villages to be submerged in floodwater and five bridges to be washed away. As many as 6,000 people were evacuated in Nabarangpur, and an estimated 65,000 people were directly affected by the dangerous weather. By July 31, at least seven people had been killed as a result of the storm. Total losses were estimated at Rs 2187.2 million (US$34 million).

=== Depression LAND 01 ===
- Depression (IMD)
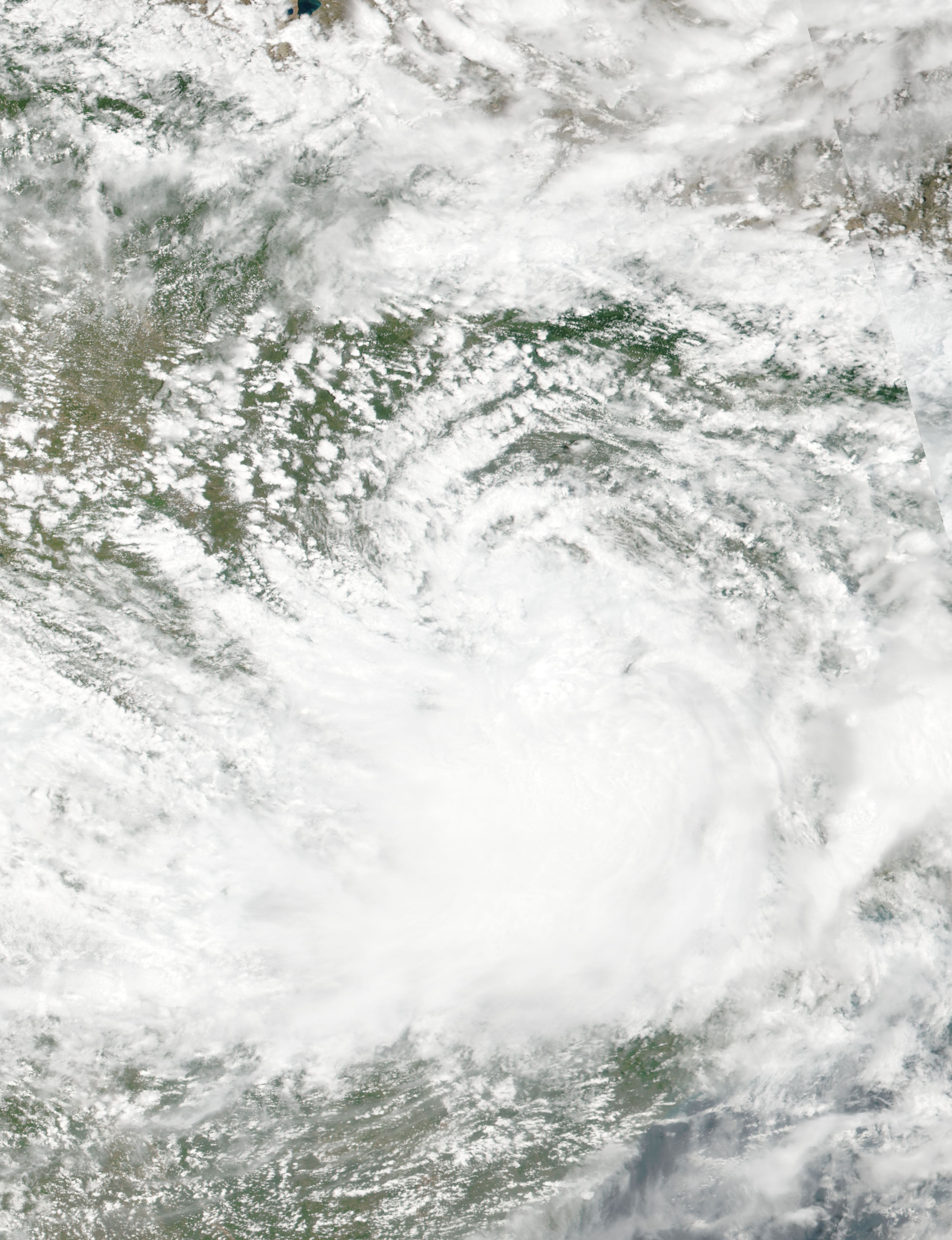
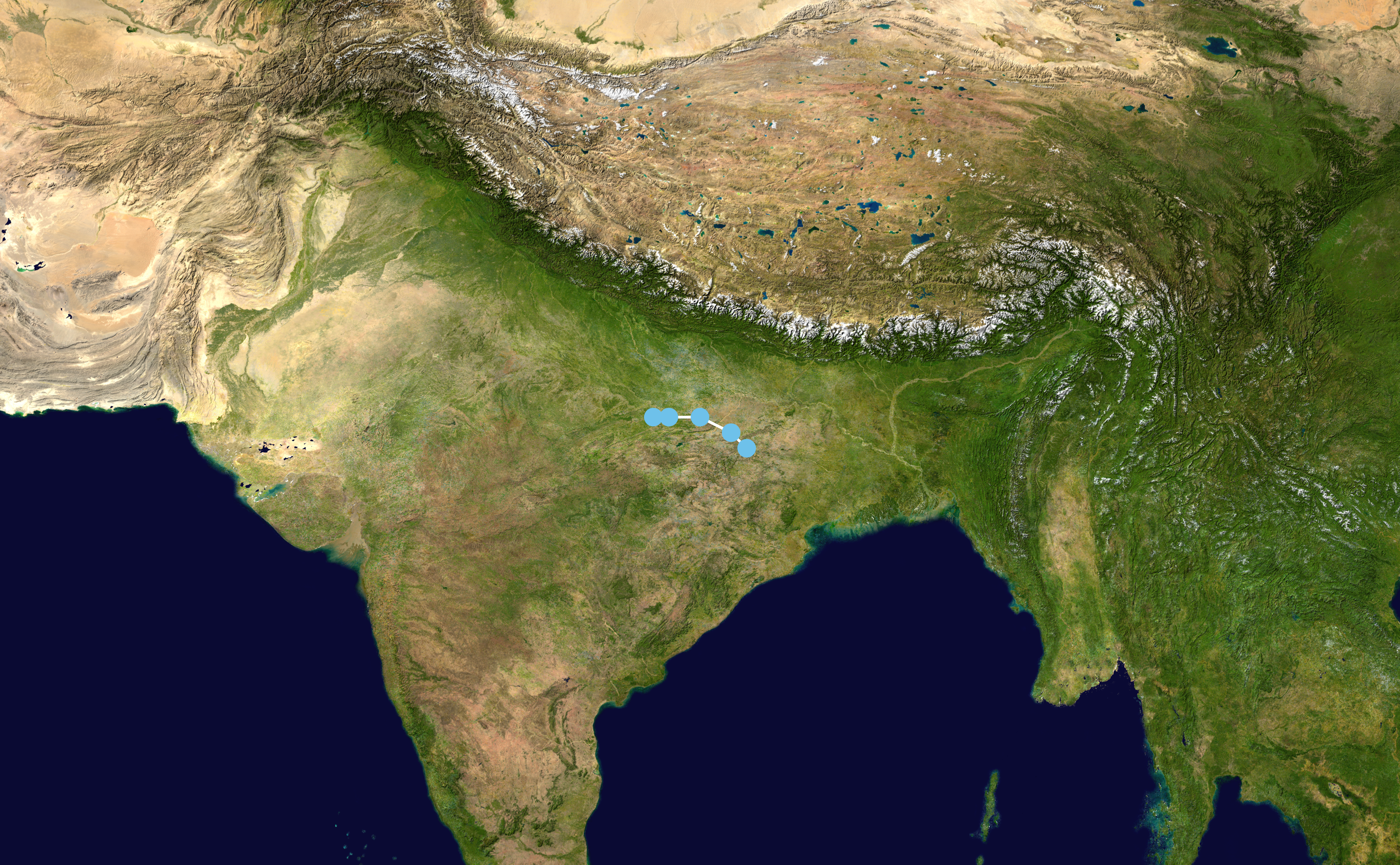
- Duration: July 26 – July 27
- Peak intensity: 50 km/h (30 mph) (3-min); 992 hPa (mbar)

A well-marked low-pressure area over Jharkhand and adjoining the Gangetic West Bengal intensified into a depression on July 26. It moved in a west-northwest direction until degenerated to a well marked low-pressure area over east Madhya Pradesh during the next day.

As a precursor low, the storm caused dangerous floods in West Bengal. At least 152 people died, while nearly 2 million people were affected in over 160 villages, which were inundated due to heavy rains. 2,301 people were evacuated from their houses and 202,957 hectares (501,520 acres) of agricultural land were submerged. Around 7,868 houses were entirely destroyed, while 44,361 were partially damaged in West Bengal. The state lost around Rs 14000 crores (US$2.18 billion) due to the storm. Eleven people were reported to be killed in Jharkhand, due to the heavy rains. The system caused flooding rains from West Bengal to East Rajasthan. In Jharkhand, Latehar recorded 270 mm (11 in) of rain, and Pratapgarh in Rajasthan recorded 240 mm (9.5 in) of rain, along with sustained winds of 45 km/h. In West Bengal, Halisahar recorded 189 mm.

=== Deep Depression LAND 02 ===
- Deep depression (IMD)
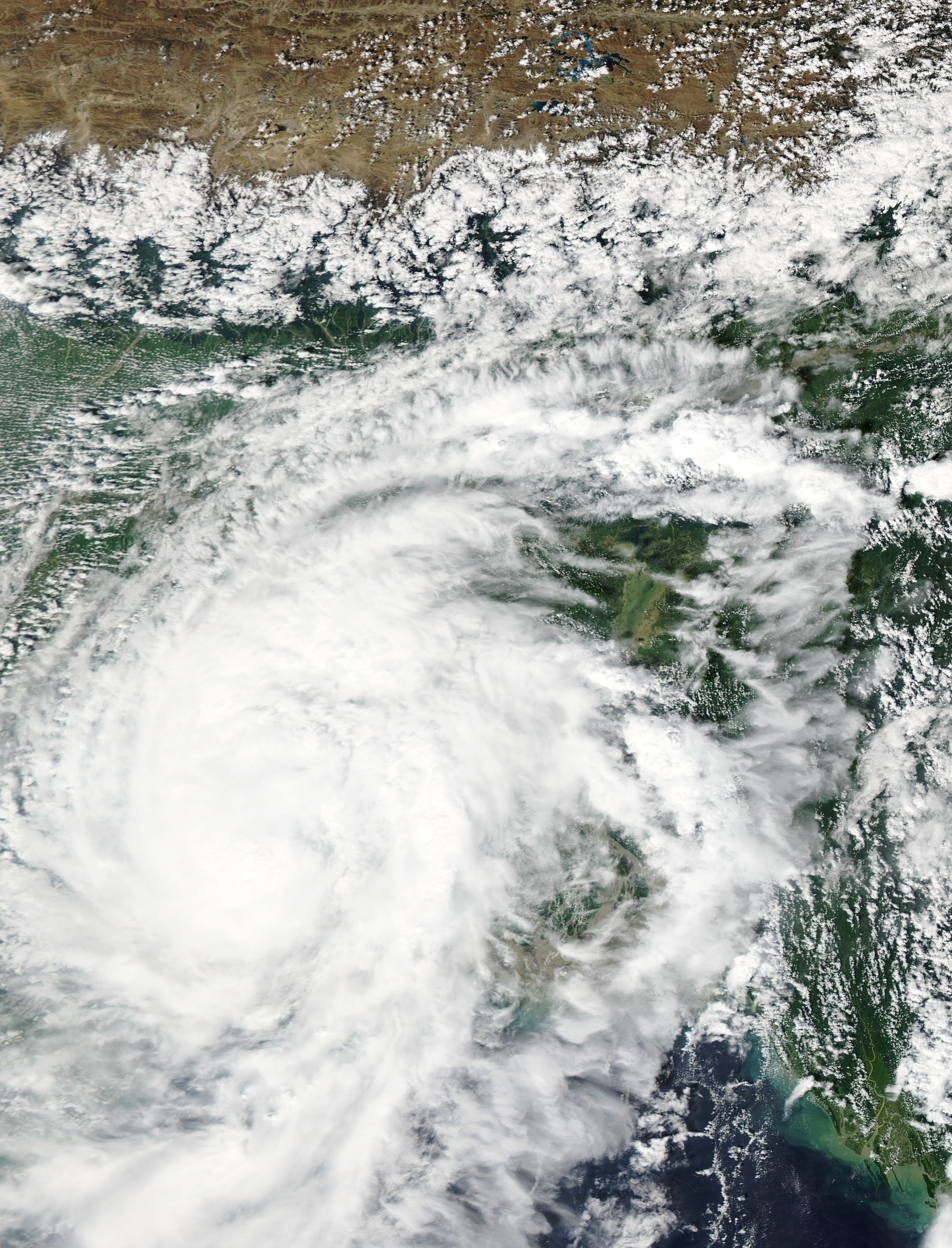
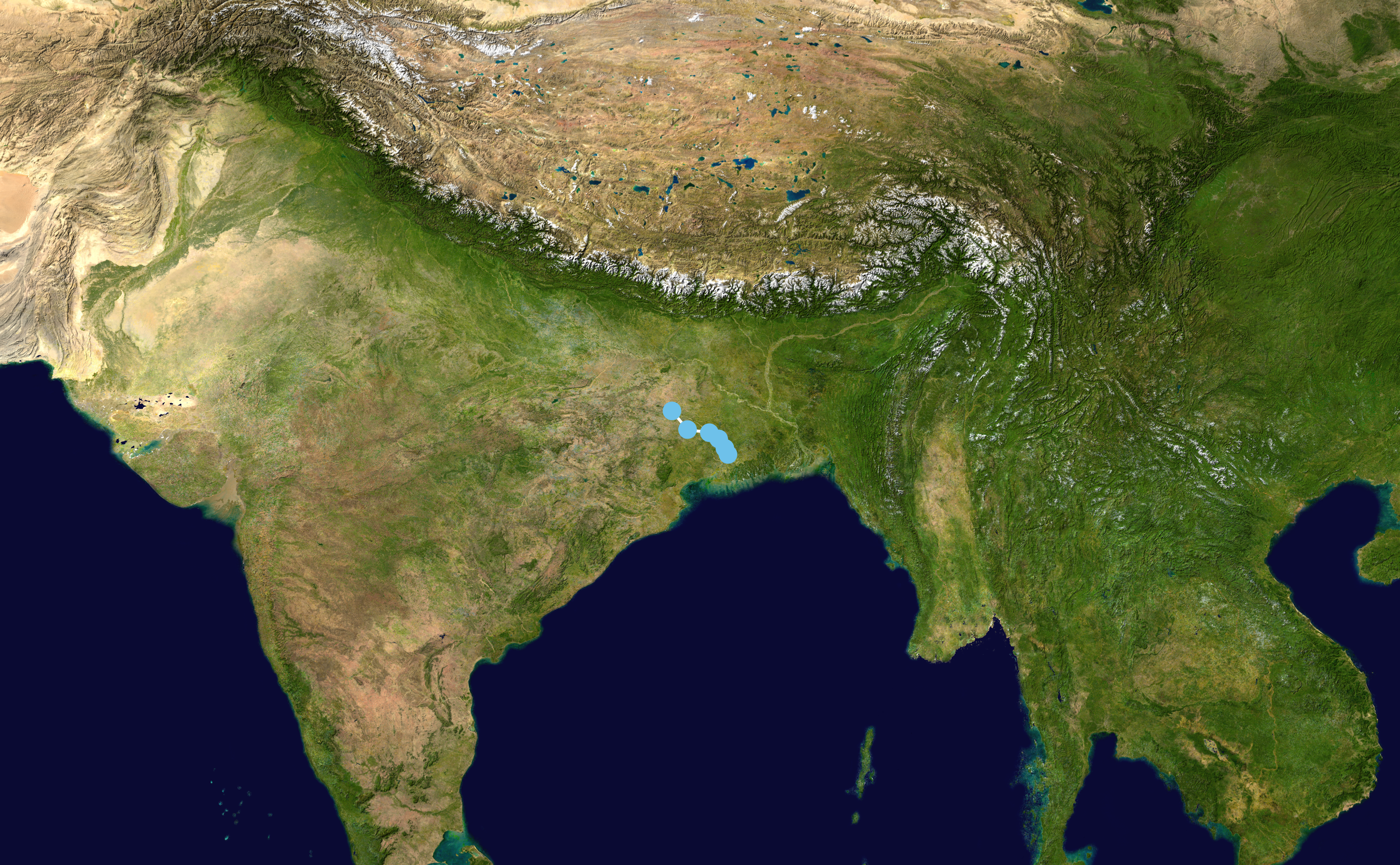
- Duration: October 9 – October 10
- Peak intensity: 55 km/h (35 mph) (3-min); 996 hPa (mbar)

Under active monsoonal conditions, a low-pressure area formed over the north Bay of Bengal, near south Bangladesh on October 8. On the following day, the system intensified further into a well-marked low-pressure area over the same region, and later, into a depression over the northern Bay of Bengal, near the West Bengal coast. The Madden–Julian oscillation lay over phase 4 with amplitude 1 and these conditions helped in maintaining the intensity of the system and associated convection and thus the storm intensified further into a deep depression later on the same day. An anticyclonic circulation lay over central India in the middle & upper tropospheric levels thus making the system move in a north-northwesterly direction. The storm encountered with strong wind shear, which caused it to weaken rapidly into a low-pressure area over west Jharkhand, on October 10.

The system produced heavy rainfall in East India, and also caused 3 deaths in Odisha by lightning and heavy rainfall. The system caused 200 mm of rainfall in Durgapur. Halisahar recorded 105 mm with strong gusty wind of 65 km/h. Kolkata was badly affected by the dangerous weather receiving rain up to 124.4 mm (4.9 in). Strong winds along with incessant rains slowed down traffic, uprooted trees and collapsed buildings. Departure of flights from Kolkata Airport were canceled, due to strong gusty wind of about 70 kmph, at least 23 domestic flights were diverted due to the bad weather. Couple of accidental death also happened due to the rain. An elderly person was electrocuted when he accidentally touched a lamppost. A youth died after an uprooted tree fell on him. Bangladesh was also affected by severe weather conditions. Torrential rain fell, peaking at Jessore receiving 109 mm (4.3 in) in 24 hrs. Maritime ports of Chittagong, Cox's Bazar, Mongla and Payra had been advised in Bangladesh to hoist local cautionary signal number three.

=== Depression BOB 05 ===
- Depression (IMD)
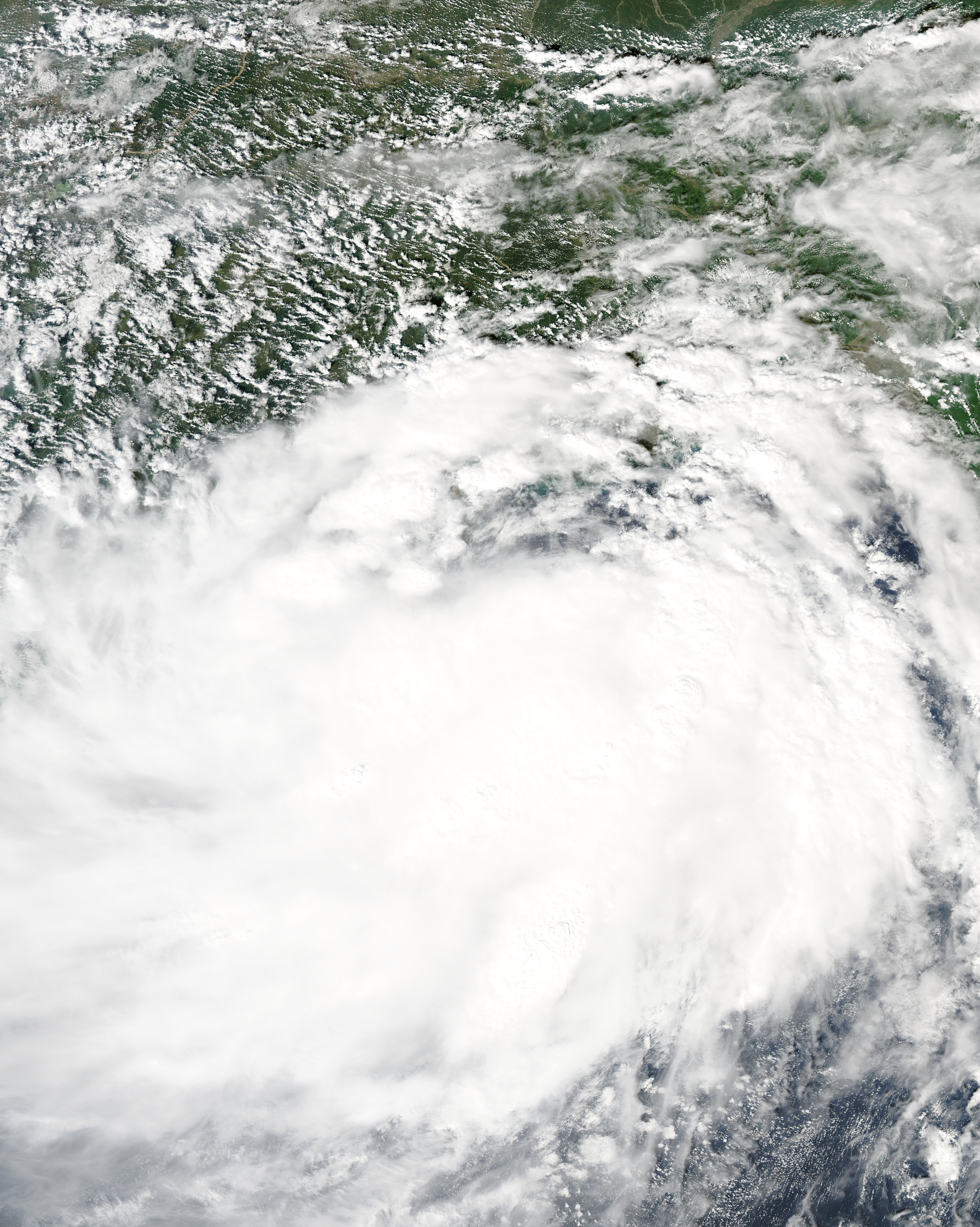
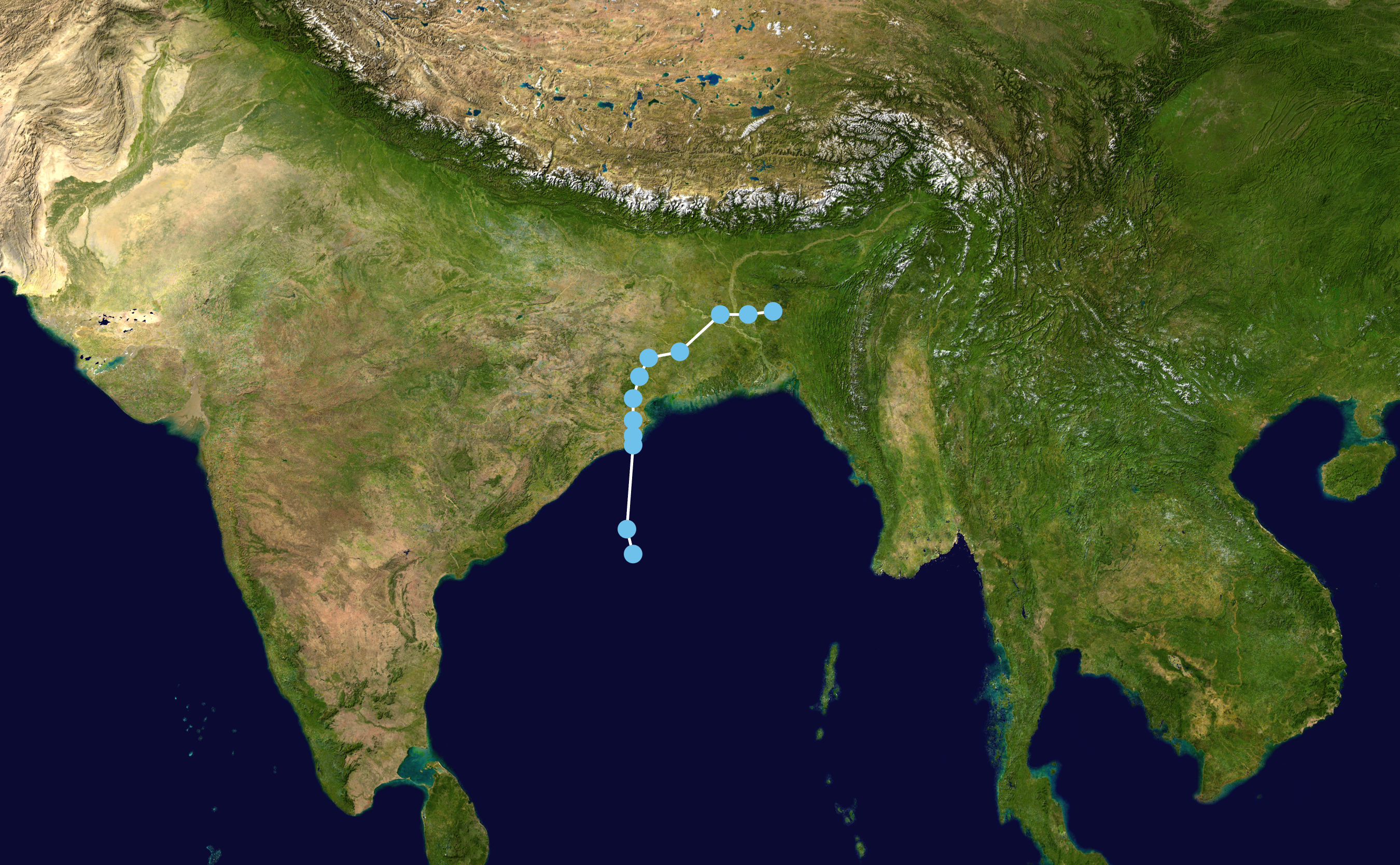
- Duration: October 19 – October 22
- Peak intensity: 45 km/h (30 mph) (3-min); 997 hPa (mbar)

On October 18, the JTWC noted an area of thunderstorm activity located in the eastern Bay of Bengal as having a partially exposed low level center while located in a marginally favorable environment for further development. Later that day, the IMD upgraded the system to Depression BOB 05 as the system developed formative banding surrounding a center of deep thunderstorm activity. Despite being initially forecasted to intensify further, the depression tracked into an environment with strong wind shear and failed to intensify, making landfall on the Odisha coast near Paradip during the afternoon of October 20. After landfall, the system remained near the coastline, allowing moisture incursion from the Bay of Bengal to prevent rapid weakening. Initially tracking northwards, the system soon recurved towards the northeast before weakening into an area of low pressure early on October 22, while located over northeastern Bangladesh, Meghalaya, and southern Assam.

On October 20, the Odisha state government declared the heavy rains caused by the storm as a "State-Specific Disaster". Up to 25 blocks of eight districts in the state had received rainfall exceeding 135 mm (5 in), with the Kanas block of the Puri district recording rainfall of 274 mm (10 in). Heavy damage to homes were reported in Balasore and Bhadrak districts, with an infant reported to have died in the former district following the collapse of a wall.

West Bengal was similarly affected by torrential rain, with Kolkata reporting 110 mm (5 in) of rain and the Bankura district reporting 279 mm (10 in). In North 24 pargana district, Halisahar recorded 116 mm and strong winds of about 55 km/h. In the East Midnapore district, a key bridge linking the seaside tourist destinations of Shankarpur and Tajpur collapsed due to strong waves and a storm surge of 1.5 m (5 ft) from the Bay of Bengal as the storm passed through the area. Large portions of the Jamura-Shyampur village near the bridge were similarly reported to have been inundated by the storm surge. In addition, the town of Cherapunji in Meghalaya reported rainfall of 283 mm (10 in) – among the highest reported in association with the depression.

In Bangladesh, the ports of Chittagong, Cox's Bazar, Mongla and Payra raised Signal No. 3 as a result of the strong crosswinds and heavy rainfall. Heavy rainfall was witnessed in the country, with the highest total reported at Gopalganj of 279 mm (10 in) of rain.

=== Depression BOB 06 ===
- Depression (IMD)
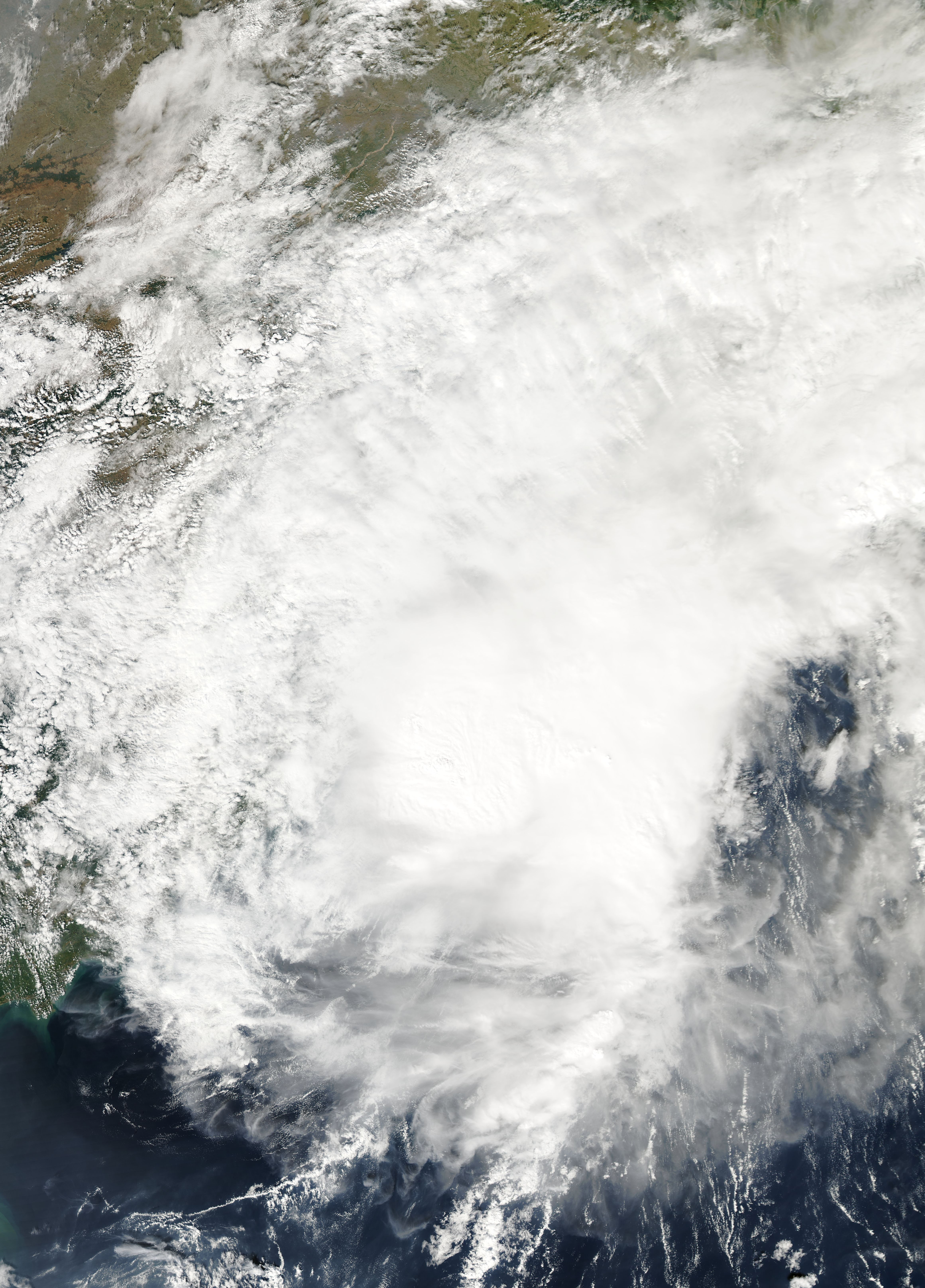
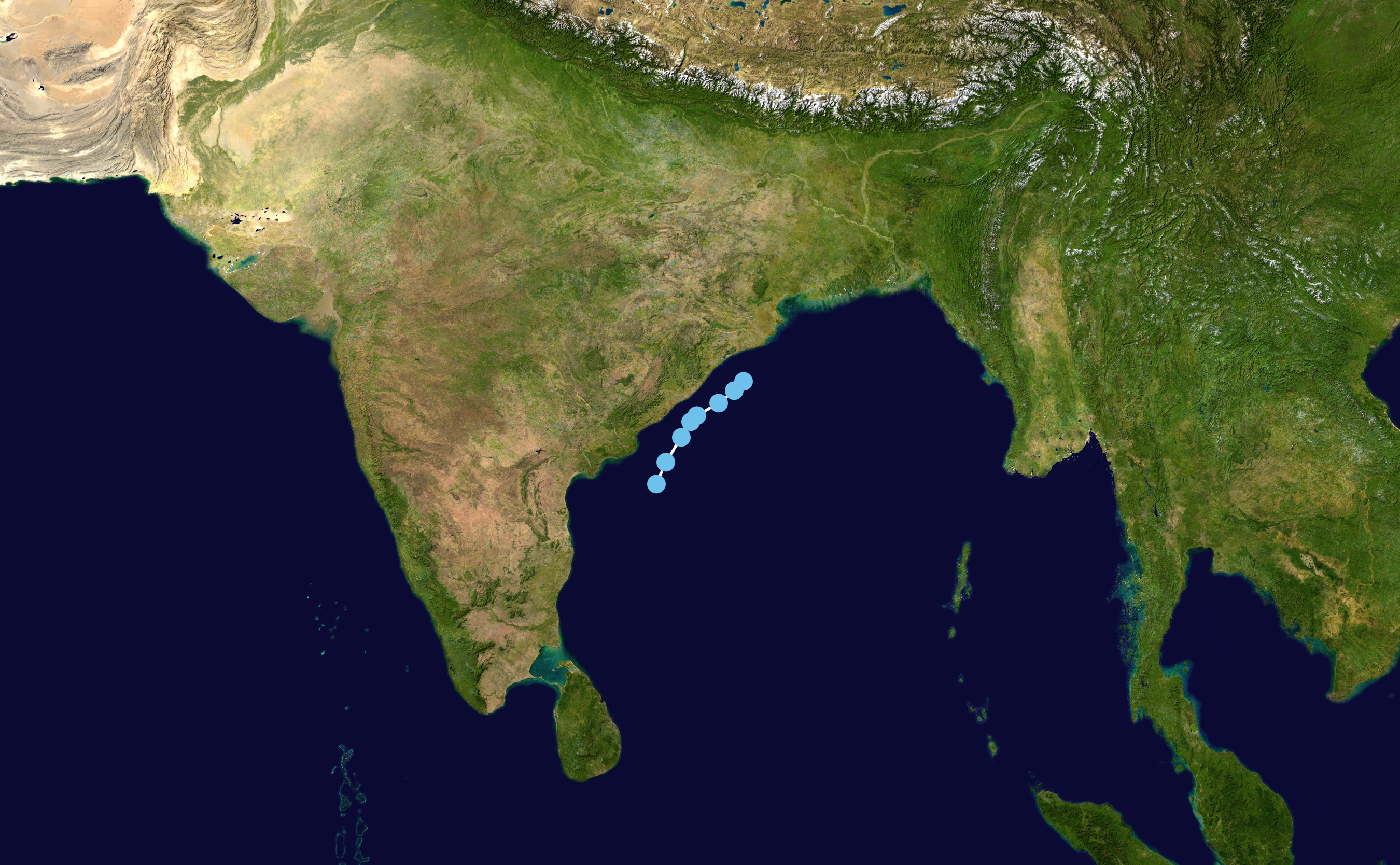
- Duration: November 15 – November 17
- Peak intensity: 45 km/h (30 mph) (3-min); 1000 hPa (mbar)

On November 9, an area of low pressure formed in the Bay of Bengal, off the coast of Sri Lanka. The storm moved northwards, but failed to organize further, due to strong wind shear. Conditions later improved while the system moved north-northeastwards, and intensified into a depression on November 15. The IMD subsequently gave the system the identifier BOB 06. On November 17, BOB 06 weakened off the coast of north Odisha into a well-marked low-pressure area as it encountered strong wind shear, with the IMD issuing their final advisory on the system.

Depression BOB 06 caused heavy rainfall, damaging standing paddy crops in Sompeta, Vajrapukotturu, Ichchapuram, Mandasa and some other areas in Srikakulam district in Andhra Pradesh. The system caused heavy rain in Odisha as it tracked along the coastline. Kolkata recorded 53.7 mm rainfall, Digha recorded 60 mm rain while Halisahar recorded 58 mm rain and Diamond Harbour in coastal South 24 Parganas district recorded 50 mm rain as the system moved closer. The rains from the storm caused an epidemic, which caused the death of hundreds of cattle at Gumabirsinghur village in the Ganjam District, in Odisha. As a precursor low, the storm caused heavy rain in Tamil Nadu including Chennai, and caused 20 confirmed fatalities.

=== Very Severe Cyclonic Storm Ockhi ===
- Very severe cyclonic storm (IMD)
- Category 3 tropical cyclone (SSHWS)
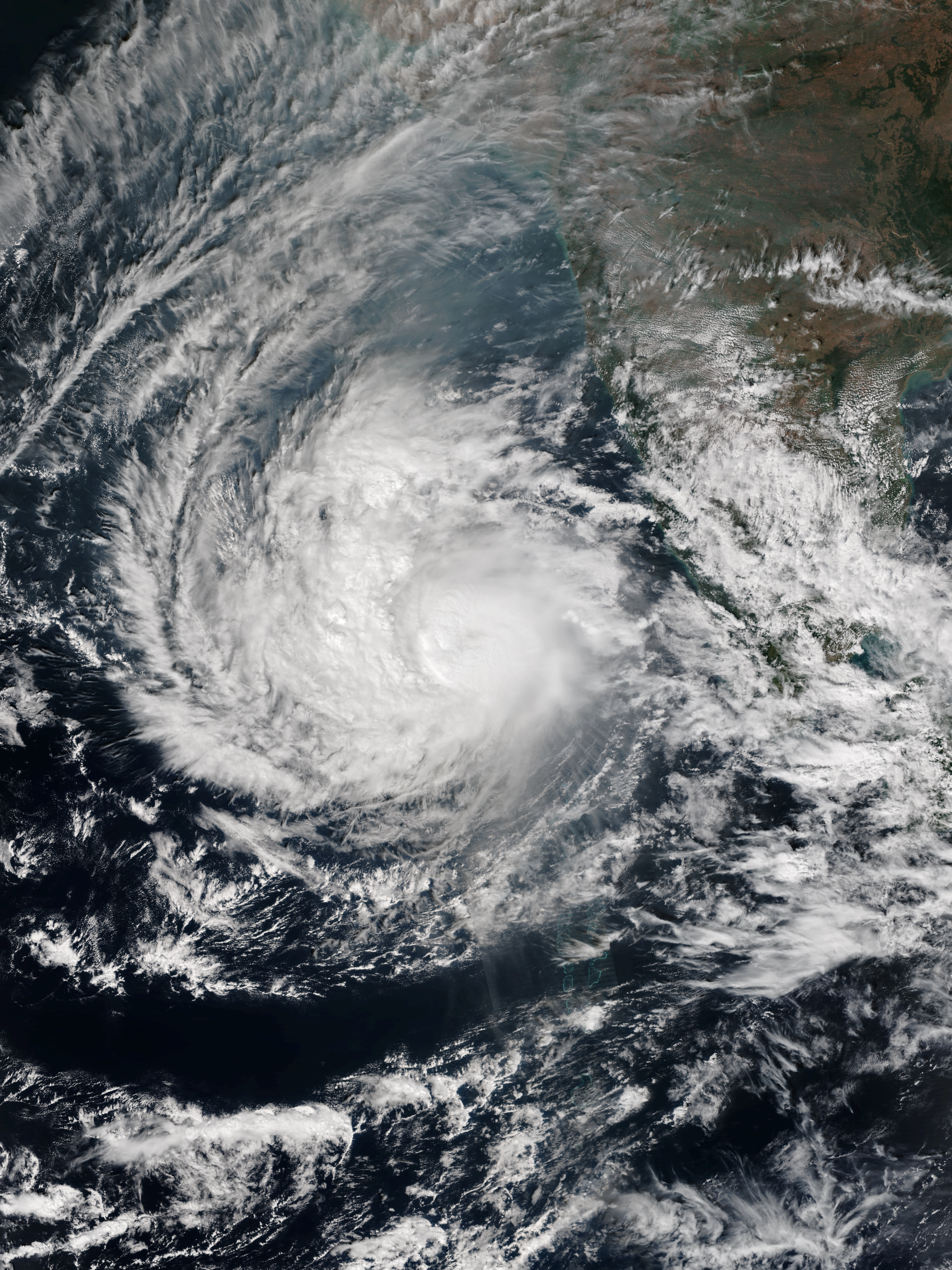
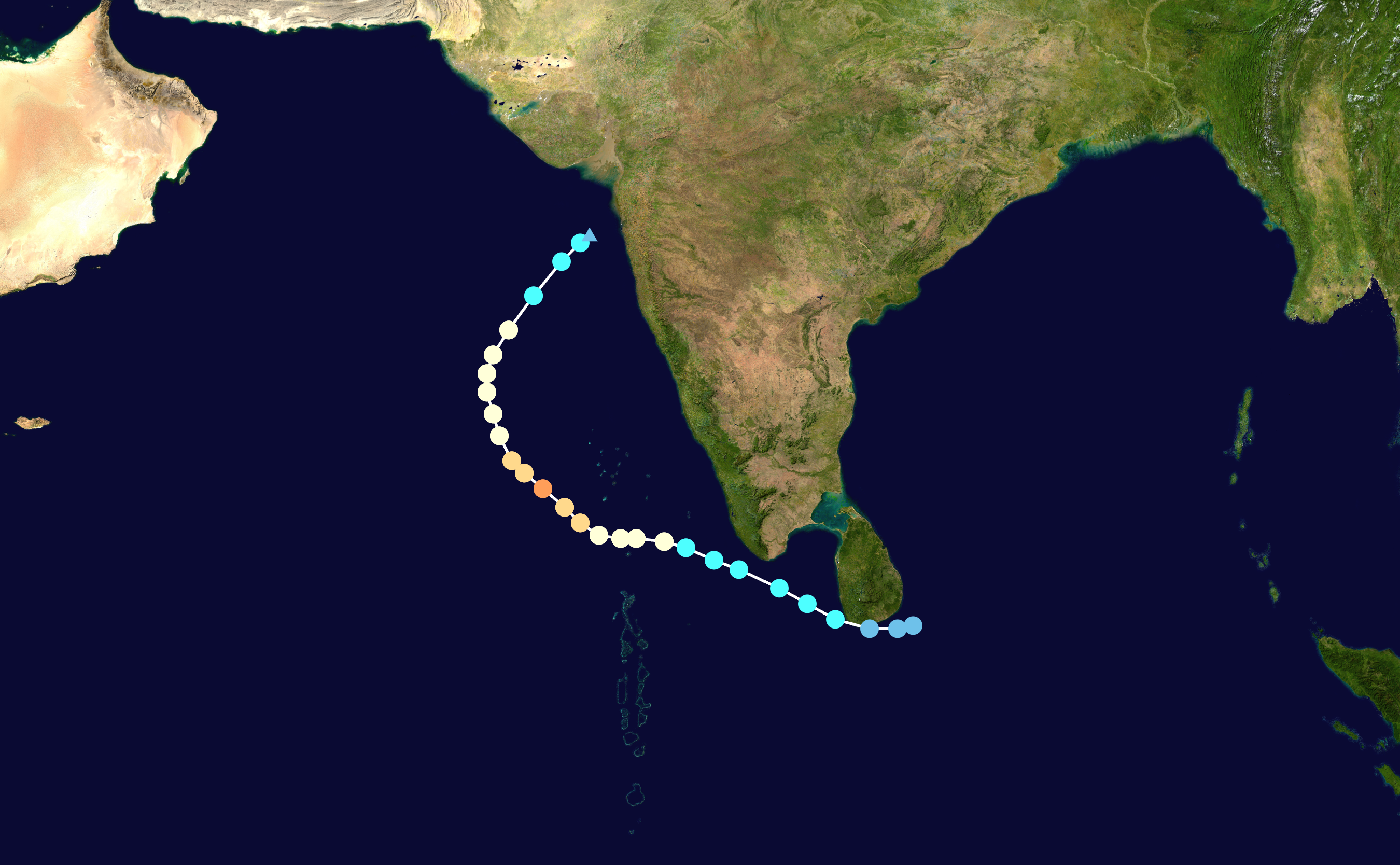
- Duration: November 29 – December 6
- Peak intensity: 155 km/h (100 mph) (3-min); 976 hPa (mbar)

On November 20, the remnant energy of Tropical Storm Kirogi led to the formation of a new low-pressure area over the Gulf of Thailand. During the next several days, the system moved into Bay of Bengal and slowly drifted westward, but the storm was unable to organize significantly, due to unfavorable conditions. On November 29, the storm organized into a depression just off the southeast coast of Sri Lanka, and the IMD gave the storm the identifier BOB 07. Due to the storm's rapidly consolidating low level circulation center the JTWC issued a TCFA on the system, shortly before classifying it as Tropical Cyclone 03B. The IMD followed suite and upgraded the storm to a Deep Depression, and soon afterwards to Cyclonic Storm Ockhi. (Note: The name Ockhi (Bengali: অক্ষি, [ˈokʰːiˑ]) was contributed by Bangladesh and means "eye" in Bengali.) The storm tracked towards the west-northwest around the southern periphery of a subtropical ridge located over India. The storm tracked westwards, and intensified further into a Severe Cyclone Storm, early on December 1. Soon afterwards, Ockhi intensified further into a Very Severe Cyclonic Storm. On December 2, a 23 mi (37 km) eye formed, prompting the JTWC to upgrade it to a Category 3-equivalent cyclone. But the storm had a sudden turn to the north and the northeast and interacted with a Western Disturbance and a rapid deepening trough along with strong wind shear which deteriorated the overall structure of the storm. It moved further north-northeastwards towards Gujarat coast and encountered cooler sea surface temperatures and dry air intrusion from the Arabian Peninsula and was last noted as a well-marked low-pressure area off the coast of Gujarat.

As a precursor low, the system produced heavy rainfall in Sri Lanka, killing at least 13 people and displacing another 200,000. As a Deep Depression, the system lashed the coast of Tamil Nadu and Kerala, damaging infrastructure, and taking the lives of 72 more people in Kerala and 14 in Tamil Nadu.

=== Deep Depression BOB 08 (04B) ===
- Deep depression (IMD)
- Tropical storm (SSHWS)
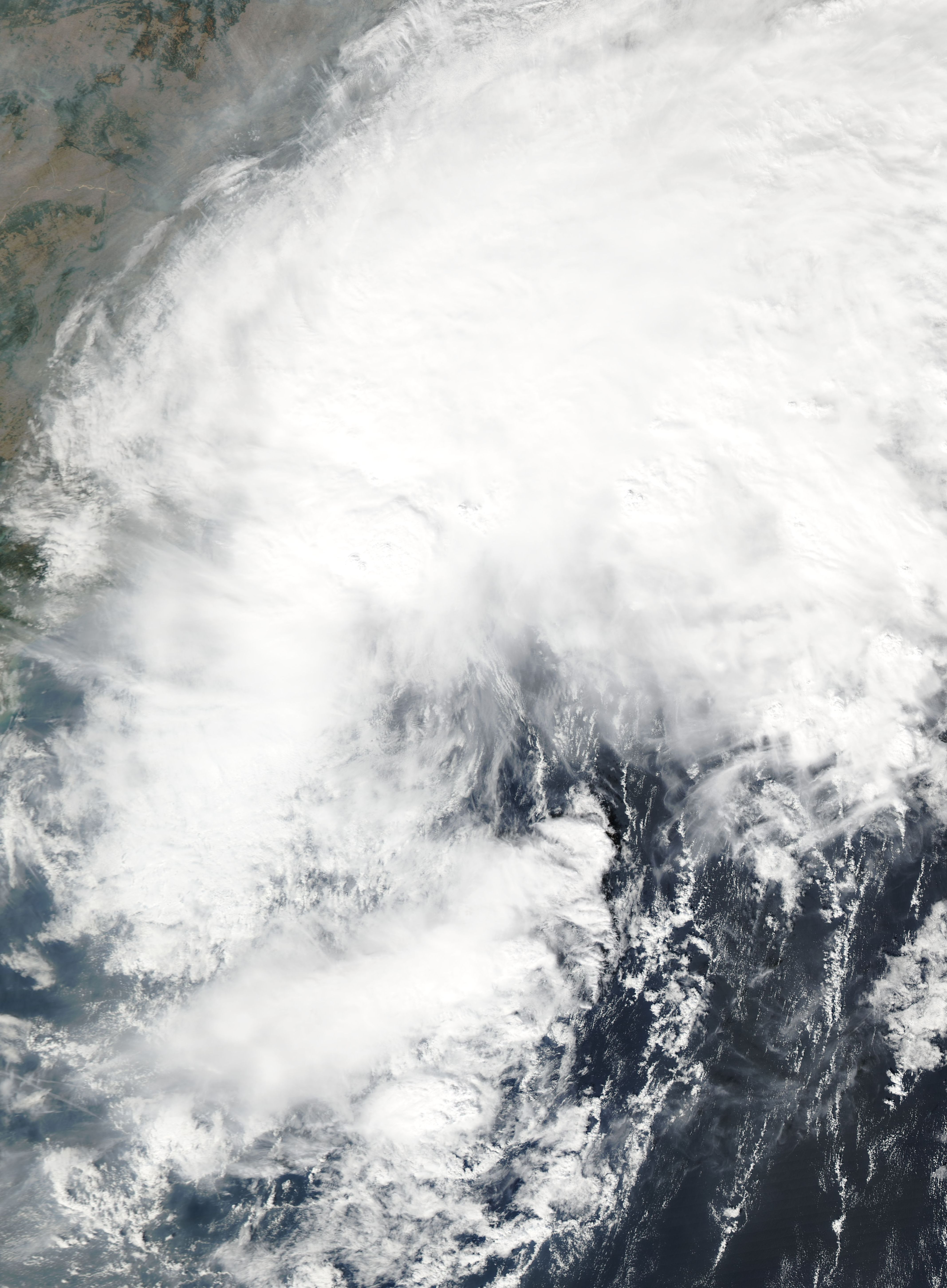
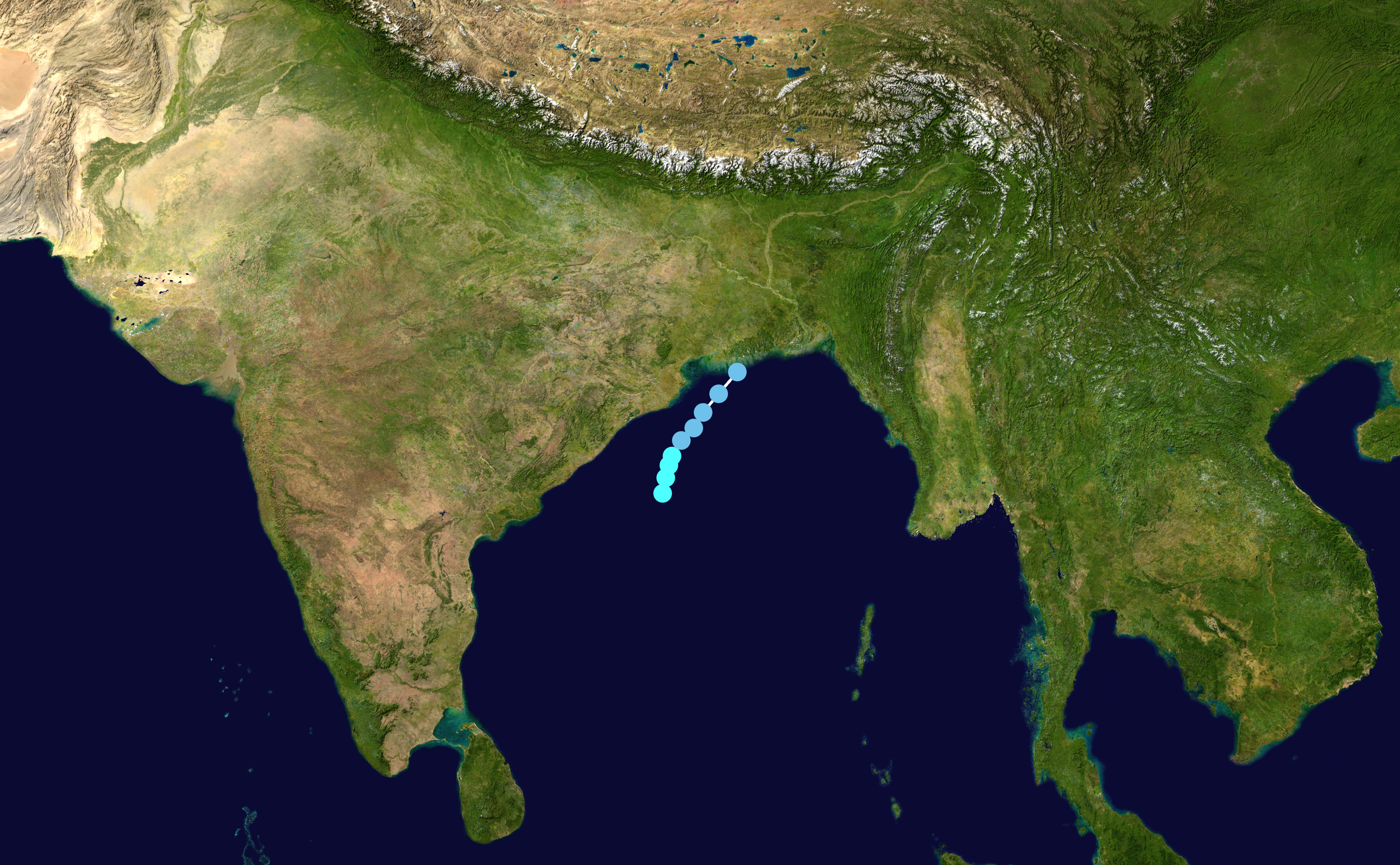
- Duration: December 6 – December 9
- Peak intensity: 55 km/h (35 mph) (3-min); 989 hPa (mbar)

A low-pressure area formed in the Malay Peninsula in early December. The system slowly drifted westwards in the Bay of Bengal, but failed to organize rapidly due to strong wind shear. Warm sea surface temperatures and a pole-ward channel helped the system to consolidate, and on December 6, the IMD initiated advisories on Depression BOB 08, while the JTWC to issued a TCFA on the system, as it intensified to a deep depression. The following day, the system depicted flaring convection to the north of the low level circulation center. At that time the storm was located in moderate vertical wind shear along with moderate poleward outflow. The system steered under the influence of a subtropical ridge. The system produced 40 knots winds in the western quadrant and the JTWC upgraded to a tropical storm. But the storm encountered high wind shear and started to rapidly decay, leading to an exposed low level circulation center with limited convection and shallow banding wrapping into a broad circulation. However an overall weak structure of the storm was noted and it rapidly weakened into a well-marked low-pressure area off the coast of West Bengal and Bangladesh on the evening of December 9.

Due to heavy rains under the influence of the storm paddy harvests died down in some parts of Rupsa block in Balasore and some pockets in Mayurbhanj district in Odisha. Paddy in acres of land was damaged in the rain at Badaopalasa, Bagedihi, Badepataka, Kendua, Olidihai, Burupalsa, Tupaghutu, Segeghutu, Jharadihui, Badakedam, Pokharia, Kuladiha, Rangamatia, Suruda, Anlajodi, Bahalda, Kanki, Basing and Gidighati.

In Bangladesh, the maritime ports of Chittagong, Cox's Bazar, Mongla and Payra had been advised to keep hoisted local cautionary signal no three. All the fishing boats and trawlers over the North Bay had been advised to remain in shelter owing to roughconditions in the sea. At some places of Dhaka, Khulna, Barisal and Chittagong, moderate to heavy rainfall were witnessed from the remnants of the system.

As a precursor low, the system caused massive floods and landslides in Indonesia and Thailand. As of December 10, 20 people were reported killed and 5 remained missing.

== Storm names ==
- Maarutha
- Mora
- Ockhi

== Season effects ==
This is a table of all storms in the 2017 North Indian Ocean cyclone season. It mentions all of the season's storms and their names, duration, peak intensities (according to the IMD storm scale), damage, and death totals. Damage and death totals include the damage and deaths caused when that storm was a precursor wave or extratropical low, and all of the damage figures are in 2017 USD.

Name	Dates	Peak intensity			Areas affected	Damage (USD)	Deaths	Ref(s).
Name	Dates	Category	Wind speed	Pressure	Areas affected	Damage (USD)	Deaths	Ref(s).
Maarutha	April 15–17	Cyclonic storm	75 km/h (45 mph)	996 hPa (29.41 inHg)	Myanmar, Andaman and Nicobar Islands, Thailand, Yunnan	$23,400	4	
Mora	May 28–31	Severe cyclonic storm	110 km/h (70 mph)	978 hPa (28.88 inHg)	Sri Lanka, Andaman and Nicobar Islands, East India, Northeast India, Bangladesh, Myanmar, Bhutan, Tibet	$297 million	135	
BOB 03	June 11–13	Deep depression	55 km/h (35 mph)	988 hPa (29.18 inHg)	Northeast India, Bangladesh	$223 million	170	
BOB 04	July 18–19	Depression	45 km/h (30 mph)	992 hPa (29.29 inHg)	Orissa, Madhya Pradesh, Chhattisgarh	$34 million	7	
LAND 01	July 26–27	Depression	45 km/h (30 mph)	992 hPa (29.29 inHg)	West Bengal, Jharkhand, Madhya Pradesh	$2.18 billion	152	
LAND 02	October 8–10	Deep depression	55 km/h (35 mph)	996 hPa (29.41 inHg)	Bangladesh, West Bengal, Jharkhand, Odisha, Andhra Pradesh	Unknown	7	
BOB 05	October 18–22	Depression	45 km/h (30 mph)	999 hPa (29.50 inHg)	Odisha, West Bengal, Northeastern India, Bangladesh	Unknown	1	
BOB 06	November 15–17	Depression	45 km/h (30 mph)	1,000 hPa (29.53 inHg)	Odisha, West Bengal, Andhra Pradesh	Unknown	20	
Ockhi	November 29 –December 6	Very severe cyclonic storm	155 km/h (95 mph)	976 hPa (28.82 inHg)	Sri Lanka, India, Maldives	$920 million	318	
BOB 08	December 5–9	Deep Depression	55 km/h (35 mph)	989 hPa (29.21 inHg)	Southern Thailand, Northern Malaysia, Aceh, Andaman and Nicobar Islands, Odisha, West Bengal, Bangladesh	Unknown	20	
Season aggregates
10 systems	April 15 – December 9		155 km/h (95 mph)	976 hPa (28.82 inHg)		$3.65 billion	834	

== See also ==
- Weather of 2017
- Tropical cyclones in 2017
- 2017 Atlantic hurricane season
- 2017 Pacific hurricane season
- 2017 Pacific typhoon season
- South-West Indian Ocean cyclone seasons: 2016–17, 2017–18
- Australian region cyclone seasons: 2016–17, 2017–18
- South Pacific cyclone seasons: 2016–17, 2017–18
- South Atlantic tropical cyclone
