= Cyclone Mora =

North Indian Ocean cyclone in 2017

Severe Cyclonic Storm Mora
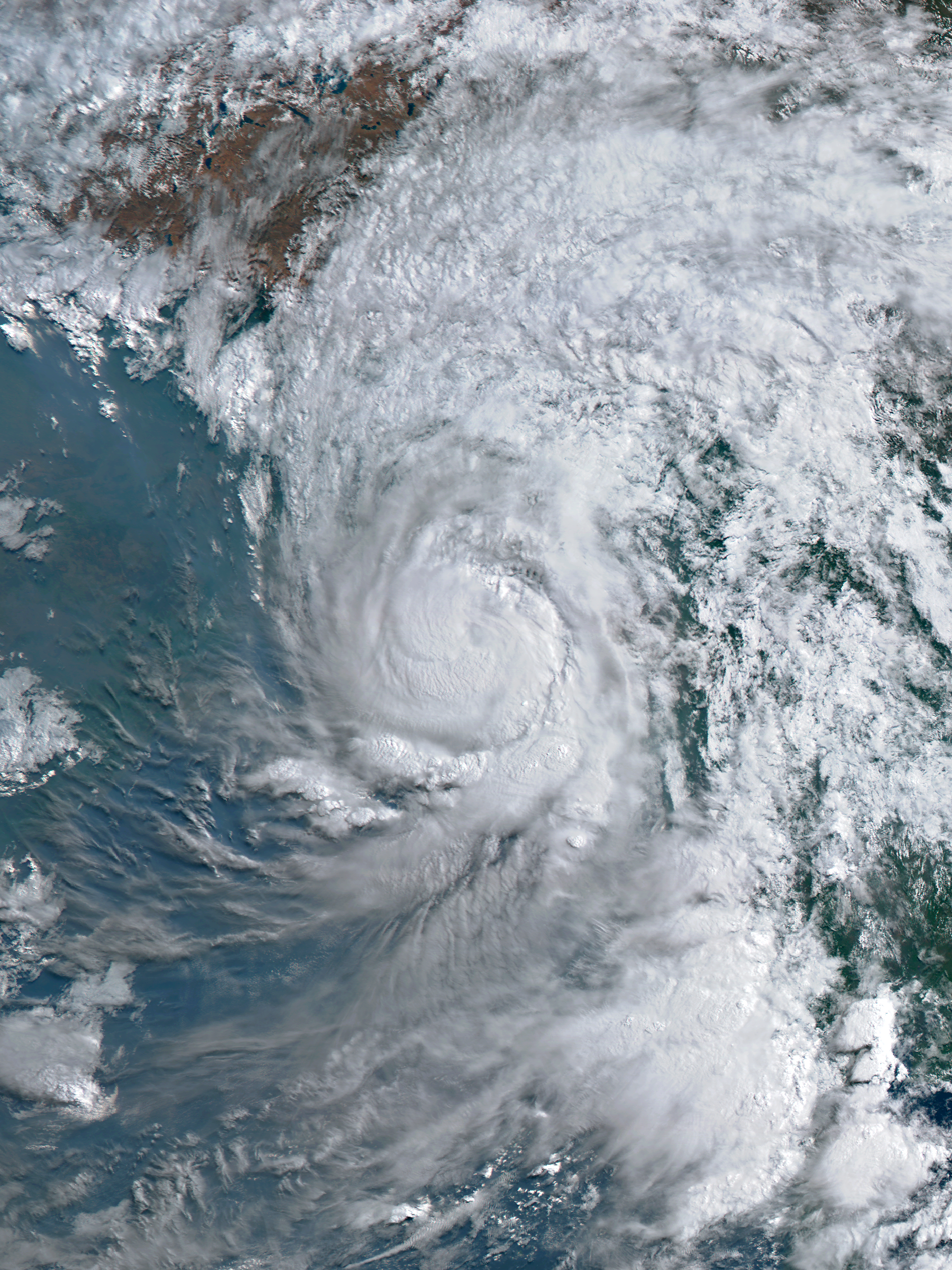
- Mora at peak strength, shortly before its Bangladeshi landfall on May 30

Meteorological history
- Formed: May 28, 2017
- Dissipated: May 31, 2017

Severe cyclonic storm
- 3-minute sustained (IMD)
- Highest winds: 110 km/h (70 mph)
- Lowest pressure: 978 hPa (mbar); 28.88 inHg

Category 1-equivalent tropical cyclone
- 1-minute sustained (SSHWS/JTWC)
- Highest winds: 150 km/h (90 mph)
- Lowest pressure: 963 hPa (mbar); 28.44 inHg

Overall effects
- Fatalities: 135 total
- Damage: $297 million (2017 USD)
- Areas affected: Sri Lanka, Andaman and Nicobar Islands, East India, Northeast India, Bangladesh, Myanmar, Bhutan, Tibet
- IBTrACS
- Part of the 2017 North Indian Ocean cyclone season

Severe Cyclonic Storm Mora (Note: The name Mora (Thai: โมรา, [moː˧ raː˧]) was contributed by Thailand and means "agate" in Thai.) was a moderately powerful but deadly tropical cyclone that caused widespread devastation and severe flooding in Sri Lanka, Andaman and Nicobar Islands, Bangladesh, Myanmar and Northeast India in May 2017. The second named storm of the 2017 annual cyclone season, Mora developed from an area of low pressure over the southeastern Bay of Bengal on May 28. Mora reached peak strength with maximum sustained winds of 110 km/h (70 mph). The cyclone made landfall near Chittagong on the morning of May 30 and steadily weakened, dissipating early in the morning on May 31. Across its path, Mora dropped a large amount of rain, including 225mm of rainfall in Chittagong and northeast India. The storm is estimated to have caused damages nearing US$300 million.

== Meteorological history ==
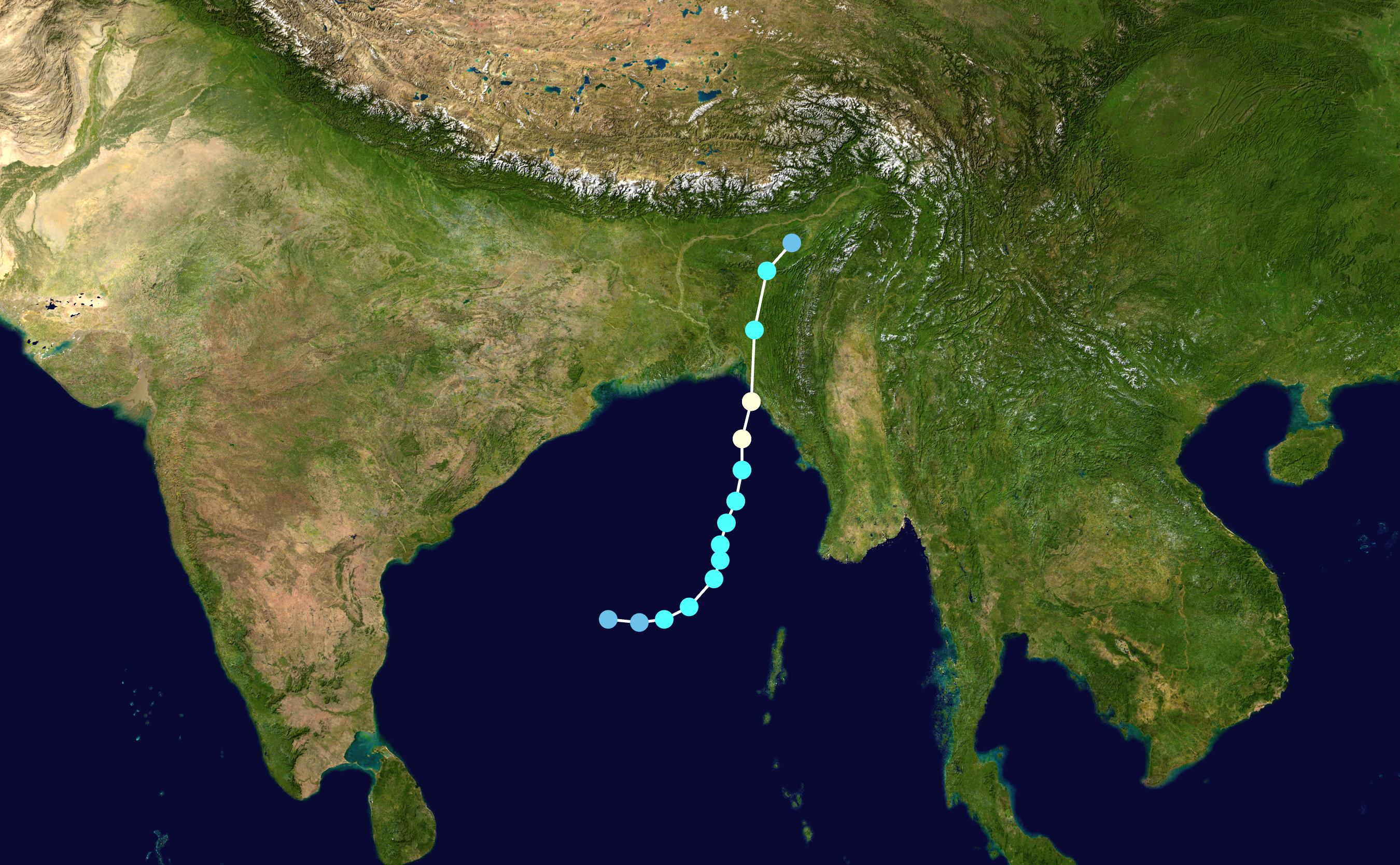
Map plotting the storm's track and intensity, according to the Saffir–Simpson scale Map key Saffir–Simpson scale Tropical depression (≤38 mph, ≤62 km/h) Tropical storm (39–73 mph, 63–118 km/h) Category 1 (74–95 mph, 119–153 km/h) Category 2 (96–110 mph, 154–177 km/h) Category 3 (111–129 mph, 178–208 km/h) Category 4 (130–156 mph, 209–251 km/h) Category 5 (≥157 mph, ≥252 km/h) Unknown Storm type Tropical cyclone Subtropical cyclone Extratropical cyclone, remnant low, tropical disturbance, or monsoon depression

In late May 2017, an area of convection began to organize in the Bay of Bengal. Favorable conditions, characterized by low wind shear and warm sea surface temperatures, allowed for the development of rainbands and the beginnings of circulation on May 27. That same day, the India Meteorological Department (IMD) noted that there was a high likelihood that the low-pressure area would organize into a tropical depression. The Joint Typhoon Warning Center also issued a Tropical Cyclone Formation Alert on May 27, citing the persistent thunderstorm activity and the consolidating center of circulation. The Joint Typhoon Warning Center classified the disturbance as a tropical cyclone when the storm continued to intensify. The storm's motion was influenced primarily by a nearby subtropical ridge, forcing the system to take a north-northeasterly track.

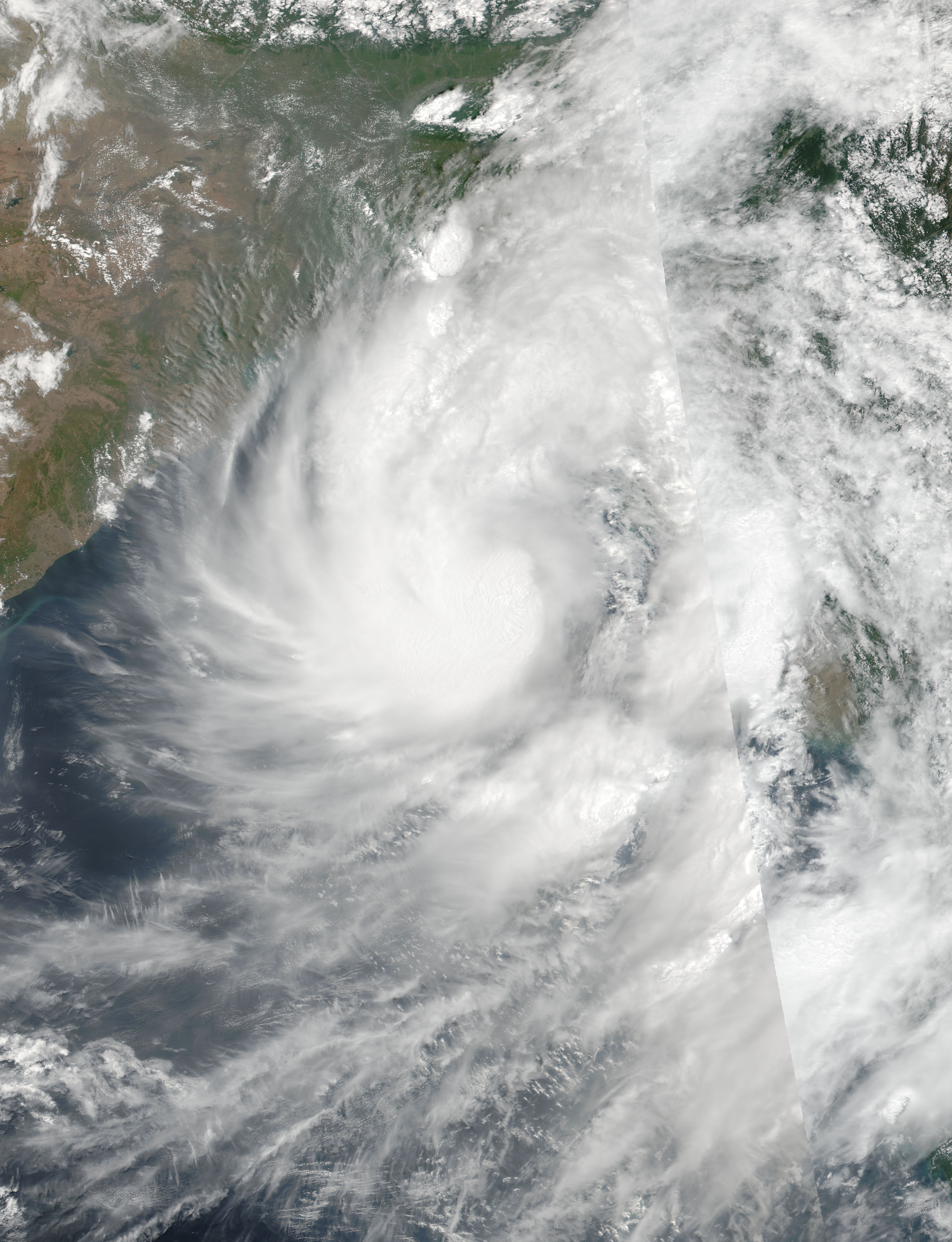
Cyclone Mora intensifying over the Bay of Bengal on May 29

Cloud tops over southeastern Bangladesh exceeded 15.3 km (9.5 miles), and over the Bay of Bengal cloud tops reached almost 16 km (9.9 miles). Shortly before landfall, the storm reached its peak intensity as a severe cyclonic storm with winds of 70 mph (115 km/h) and a minimum central pressure of 978 hPa (mbar). The JTWC noted that the storm reached category 1 hurricane strength with winds of 75 mph (120 km/h). Animated enhanced infrared satellite imagery depicted improved consolidation with an eye feature on the morning of May 30.

== Preparations ==
=== Bangladesh ===
With Mora's relatively rapid intensification, Bangladeshi authorities were hard pressed to carry out evacuations in preparation for the storm. Maritime weather alerts were issued for the Bangladeshi ports of Chittagong, Cox's Bazar, Mongla and Payra, under the anticipation of a 1.2 to 1.5 m (4 to 5 ft) storm surge. All flights out of Shah Amanat International Airport were cancelled. Authorities attempted to evacuate 1 million people prior to landfall, however by May 29, only 300,000 had done so. Red Crescent volunteers and medical units were on alert as government offices in coastal zones closed. A meteorological office issued a warning for Chittagong and Cox's Bazar as the cyclonic storm Mora headed towards Bangladesh.

=== East and Northeast India ===
The India Meteorological Department issued Tropical cyclone warnings and watches for the Indian states of Mizoram, Nagaland, Manipur, West Bengal and Tripura. The Mizoram government expected that the cyclone could cause landslides and floods, so warnings were issued which advised residents to take precautions and preventive measures. The Indian Navy's Eastern fleet had was put on high alert to extend aid into Bangladesh.

=== Myanmar ===
The Myanmar Red Cross Society placed alerts in Chin, Rakhine, Magway, and Sagaing, and activated emergency response teams. Early warning messages were sent to at risk communities, and volunteers were ready to respond and provide aid supplies. Emergency response teams, as well as emergency volunteers from the community also assisted in the evacuation of those affected. The MRCS Emergency Operation Centre (EOC) was initiated on May 29, following the Standard Operating Procedures for MRCS disaster response. On May 30, the Emergency Task Force had its first meeting to plan for the response.

== Impact ==
=== Bangladesh ===
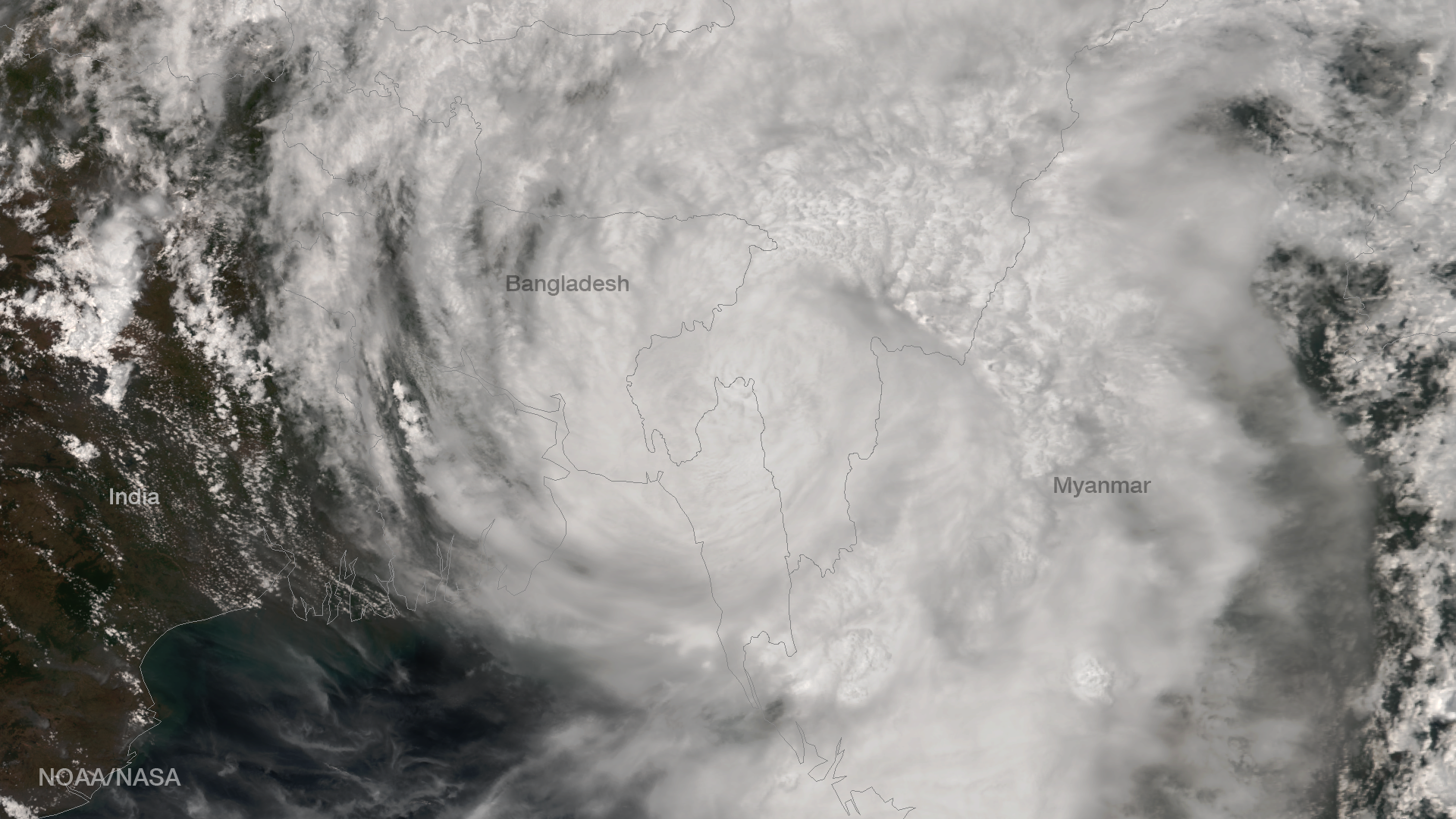
Mora onshore near Chittagong on 30 May

A total of 500,000 people managed to move out of coastal areas before the storm made landfall on May 31. Strong winds and storm surge battered buildings and destroyed farmlands across Chittagong, Cox's Bazar, and Rangamati. At least 20,000 houses were damaged in refugee camps for Rohingya Muslims, who were displaced by conflict in neighboring Myanmar. As of May 31, 2017, nine people were reported to be killed across Bangladesh. In addition, 81 Bangladeshi fishermen were reported to be missing after the storm.

External videos
- Conditions on Bangladesh when Severe cyclonic storm Mora made landfall YouTube video

For two days, Mora dropped very heavy rainfall in Bangladesh. On May 30, rainfall of 225.2 mm was observed in Chittagong, 213 mm was observed over Sandwip, 208 mm over Sitakunda, and 187 mm over Rangamati. On May 31, rainfall of 196 mm over Netrokona and 139 mm over Hatiya was reported. Infrastructural loss ranged between ৳400–450 million (US$4.96–5.58 million).

=== Sri Lanka ===
Mora worsened ongoing floods in Sri Lanka by strengthening the southwest monsoon. Mora caused flooding and landslides throughout Sri Lanka in the final week of May 2017. 15 districts had been affected, killing 203 people and leaving 96 people missing. Damage reached US$197 million

=== Myanmar ===
Cyclone Mora made landfall in Myanmar in the early morning on May 30. The storm moved inland from the Bay of Bengal, and caused damage in the Arakan and Chin states. The cyclone destroyed 4,702 houses and damaged to 13,595 houses in Arakan State, Chin State and Irrawaddy Division. The government reported that 325 schools, 32 office buildings, and 57 religious buildings were entirely destroyed, while 429 non-residential buildings were heavily damaged. A number of other buildings were severely damaged, including 23 hospitals and clinics, 23 governmental buildings, three bridges, 38 utility poles and 22 motorboats.

An 11-year-old boy was killed by a tree branch that fell in Kutupalong refugee camp in Cox's Bazar. In Myanmar, a 10-year-old boy went missing after he was taken away by the rising waters. A tornado also formed in Rahkine which killed 2 and injured 6 people.

=== Bhutan ===
On May 31 at around 5 am the remnants of Cyclone Mora brought rainfall to 18 meteorological stations across Bhutan. The most recorded rainfall was 28.6mm, which was recorded in Dagana. No damage or deaths were reported in Bhutan.

== Effects in Northeast India ==
Cyclone Mora caused severe flooding in the Indian states of Meghalaya, Assam, Manipur and Mizoram in northeast India.

Death toll
| Manipur | 19 |
| Nagaland | 4 |
| West Bengal | 2 |
| Total | 25 |

=== Manipur ===
The loss of flooding in the state were about ₹1.31 billion (US$20.3 million).

=== Mizoram ===
Heavy rains caused by cyclone Mora hit the Indian state of Mizoram, disrupting power and telecommunications. About 20 houses were partially destroyed in the village of Khawbung, while the roof of a district hospital ward was swept away in Siaha district. Officials stated that the rain caused mudslides. An uprooted tree crushed a pastor's home in Serkawm village.

=== Assam ===
The Indian region of Assam on was hit by severe rainstorms due to Mora. The rain triggered floods that caused 59,000 families to abandon the flooded districts of Lakhimpur, Karimganj and Darrang. The storms devastated scores of homes.

== Effects on Rohingya refugees ==
As of 2017, Bangladesh's border region is home to approximately 1,100,000 Rohingya refugees from Myanmar. When Cyclone Mora struck the islands of St. Martin and Teknaf, 200,000 people evacuated to shelters. 10,000 thatched huts in the Balukhali and Kutupalong camps were destroyed. Many Rohingya refugees did not abandon their makeshift shelters when the storm struck. One quarter of the buildings in the two camps had been damaged, including community and health centers. UN Women, in partnership with the Office of the United Nations High Commissioner for Refugees, helped to provide emergency shelters and other supports to ensure the safety and protection of thousands of women in the two Rohingya refugee camps in Cox's Bazar. The nation of Denmark donated 2.53 billion taka to the refugees.

=== Bangladesh ===
The United Nations High Commission for Refugees provided emergency hospital tents to the affected camps and aimed to provide waterproof plastic sheeting to affected families in Bangladesh. The International Organization for Migration provided shelter and emergency healthcare. The organization also supervised repairs to damaged health facilities and sanitation services. The World Food Program provided emergency food rations and large quantities of dry biscuits to affected residents, while the United Nations Children's Fund supplied hygiene kits, water purification tablets, and recreation kits for affected refugee children. The United Nations Population Fund provided high-quality medical care to pregnant women, new mothers and their newborn children in the camps.

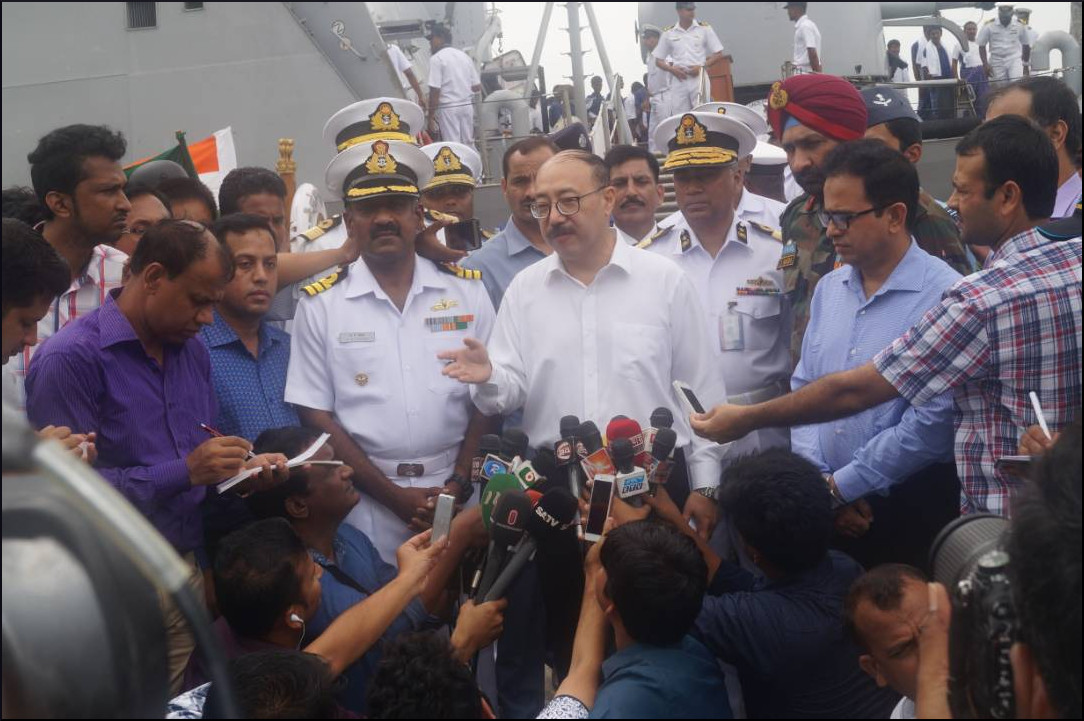
India hands over relief materials to Bangladesh

The Singapore Red Cross (SRC) has contributed US$100,000 for those affected by Mora in Bangladesh. The humanitarian organization said it has contributed US$50,000 to the Bangladesh Red Crescent Society. The donation contributed water and sanitation for 50,000 victims of the cyclone.

=== Myanmar ===
The European Commission provided €1.5 million (US$1.67 million) in humanitarian aid funding for emergency relief assistance to populations in Myanmar affected by tropical Cyclone Mora. Singapore Red Cross provided US$50,000 to Myanmar Red Cross for the purchase of tarpaulins, CGI sheets, student and teacher kits for those affected in Myanmar.

== Disaster Response ==
| Country / Institution | Description | Funding USD |
|---|---|---|
| India | safe water, sanitation, foods, clothes, blankets | 936,000 |
| Hong Kong | Humanitarian assistance | 200,000 |
| Australia | Direct funding | 3,900,000 |
| China | Humanitarian assistance | 1,000,000 |
| Germany | rehabilitation of villages, sanitation | 136,000 |
| Denmark | rehabilitation of houses, agricultural support | 50,000 |
| United States | Humanitarian assistance | 500,000 |
| International Organization for Migration | Humanitarian assistance | 3,700,000 |
| Canada | Health aid, non-food items, basic needs, foods, | 15,000 |
| European Commission Humanitarian Aid Office | Emergency assistance, foods, shelter, latrines, Relief and rehabilitation | 1,500,000 |
| Singapore | emergency assistance | 1,000,000 |
| Switzerland | Humanitarian assistance | 1,740,592 |
| United Kingdom | Foods, water, medicine | 63,000 |

== See also ==
- Weather of 2017
- Tropical cyclones in 2017
- 1991 Bangladesh cyclone – a powerful cyclone that made landfall in Bangladesh in 1991, killing more than 138,000 people
- Cyclone Akash – a tropical cyclone that affected Bangladesh in 2007 and caused widespread impacts.
- Cyclone Sidr – a strong tropical cyclone that devastated the Ganga delta.
- Cyclone Roanu – a weak tropical cyclone that caused widespread impacts and severe flooding.
- Cyclone Komen – an unusual tropical cyclone that originated in the Ganga delta and later struck the same region causing massive flooding.
- Tropical cyclones in Myanmar
