= 2017 Sri Lanka floods =

Natural disaster in Sri Lanka

2017 Sri Lanka flood and landslide
- Date: May 2017
- Location: 15 districts of Sri Lanka
- Cause: Flood and Landslide
- Deaths: 224
- Injuries: 72
- Missing: 78
- Property damage: 2,093 houses fully and 11,056 houses partially destroyed

The 2017 Sri Lanka floods resulted from a heavy southwest monsoon, beginning around 18 to 19 May 2017. Flooding was worsened by the arrival of the precursor system to Cyclone Mora, causing flooding and landslides throughout Sri Lanka during the final week of May 2017. The floods affected 15 districts, killed at least 208 people and left a further 78 people missing. As of 3 June, 698,289 people were affected, while 11,056 houses were partially damaged and another 2,093 houses completely destroyed. According to Al Jazeera, about 600,000 people have been displaced due to the floods.

The flooding severely affected Sri Lanka's Western Province, Sabaragamuwa Province, Southern Province and part of Central Province. The worst-affected districts were Kalutara, Matara and Ratnapura. In Kalutara, flooding of the Kalu River also triggered several mudflows. Agalawatte, a town within Kalutara District, reported 47 deaths and 62 people missing as of 29 May, with many areas made inaccessible by landslides. The Ratnapura District had recorded 79 deaths by 30 May.

== Floods ==
Typical progression of the monsoon across the Indian subcontinent. Sri Lanka is the island east of India's southern tip

The southwest monsoon typically peaks during late May to the beginning of June in Sri Lanka, with prevailing winds from the south and southwest, streaming toward the Bay of Bengal. The areas that usually receive the heaviest rain are the south and west of the country, including Kalutara, Ratnapura, and Colombo. The monsoon was anticipated to arrive after 14 May, but owing to below-normal water levels in the region, it was initially not expected to cause severe flooding.

Parts of Sri Lanka received 300 mm – 500 mm of heavy monsoon rain in a 24-hour period by 25 May, resulting in widespread flooding. Highest recorded rainfall was 533 mm in Kukuleganga. Galle, a coastal city, received 223 mm (8.8 in) and Ratnapura experienced 453 mm (17.8 in) of rainfall during the period of 27 to 30 May, leading to severe inland flooding. On 27 May, an area of convective thunderstorms in the Bay of Bengal started to converge, moving to the northeast and becoming Cyclone Mora on 28 May. Cyclone Mora later affected Bangladesh and Myanmar.

By the evening of 25 May, the National Building Research Organisation (NBRO) of Sri Lanka had issued a "Level 3 Red Alert" landslide warning for the districts of Ratnapura, Kegalle, Galle, Kalutara, Matara, Hambantota and Nuwara Eliya. Areas within Galle District became cut off due to landslides. Part of the Southern Expressway closed, owing to flooding between Colombo and Matara. The Kelani River, which runs through Sri Lanka's largest city Colombo, measured a water level increase of 15.44 m (50.7 ft) by 9:30 a.m. Sri Lanka Time (15:00 UTC) on 27 May, and peaked by 28 May. As of 29 May, the Bolgoda Dam in Panadura was at a risk of collapse.

The death toll included at least 45 school children. By 1 June, around 95 people remained missing.

== Response ==
The Sri Lanka Armed Forces initially deployed nearly 10,000 personnel and equipment for relief, help and rescue operations. This is the biggest deployment of troops during peacetime in Sri Lanka.

The Sri Lanka Army deployed more than 1700 Army personnel of 17 Battalions, including Commando, Special Forces, Mechanized Infantry and Army medical personnel. BTRs, WMZs troop carriers and 30 Army boats and other machinery were deployed by the Army for the rescue operations. The Army also deployed sandbags for flood defenses.

The Sri Lanka Navy deployed over 110 search-and-rescue teams comprising 776 naval personnel along with 116 relief boats. The Navy began rescue work along the Kelani River by 19 May.

The Sri Lanka Air Force deployed Mil Mi-17s, Bell 212s, and Bell 412 helicopters to rescue the affected in all areas. Flights involving B200 Beechcraft were deployed for continuous reconnaissance/observations over affected areas.

During search and rescue operations a Sri Lanka Air Force Mil Mi-17E crashed over the Baddegama area, but no one aboard the chopper was injured. One member of the response team died from injuries sustained while conducting rescue operations.

At least 77,000 people were evacuated from the floods and relocated to safe locations. Sixteen hospitals in the flood-affected areas were also evacuated.

== International response ==
Foreign Minister told "16 countries had rushed relief supplies and medicine".

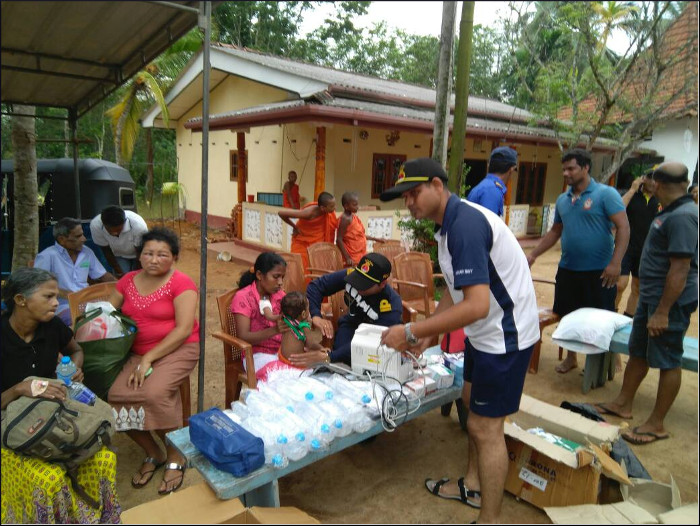
An Indian Navy medical team assisting in relief operations.

- India – India sent its first ship INS Kirch with 40 tonnes of relief materials, a second relief ship INS Shardul with specialized rescue, diving and medical teams and relief material and the third ship INS Jalashwa with additional relief materials.
- China – China sent relief items worth US$2.2 million. Three People's Liberation Army Navy ships (Type 052C destroyer, Type 054A frigate and Type 903 replenishment ship) arrived at port in Colombo with relief materials and medical teams for victims.
- USA – The US Ambassador Atul Keshap expressed his condolences on behalf of the United States and pledged willingness to help in relief efforts. US contributes approximately Rs. 350 million (US$2.3 million). On June 11, USS Lake Erie (CG-70) arrived in Colombo to join with Sri Lanka Navy for post flood recovery operations.

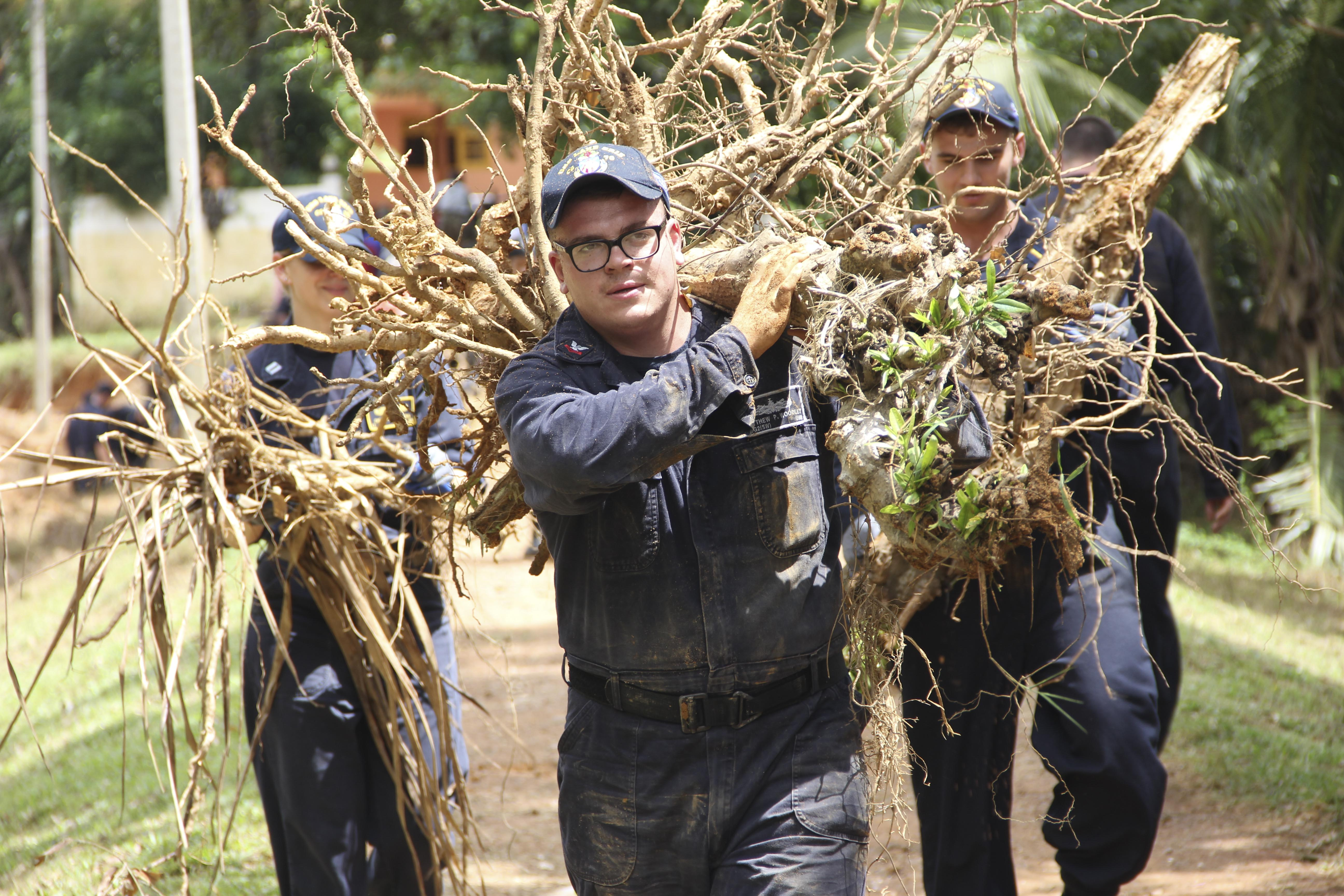
US Navy Sailors work with Sri Lankan marines in Matara, Sri Lanka during humanitarian assistance operations

- Singapore – The Singapore government donated US$100,000 through the Singapore Red Cross to support its relief efforts in Sri Lanka. Separately, Singapore Red Cross distributed US$50,000 worth of relief items to the affected communities.
- UK – The UK High Commissioner James Dauris expressed his condolences and assured support.
- Pakistan – Pakistan has sent hospital and relief materials through two cargo flights, along with doctors. Pakistan's naval ship PNS Zulfiquar arrived at Colombo with relief materials and a medical team to assist in relief operations.
- Australia – Australia promised AUD $500,000 (Rs. 57 million) to meet urgent needs, including the deployment of high-grade inflatable boats and outboard motors for search and rescue missions.
- Israel – The Israeli ambassador to India and Sri Lanka, Daniel Carmon, delivered relief items.
- Maldives – The Maldivian government donated US$250,000 (38 million) and flood relief aids.
- Korea – The Korean government donated US$250,000 (38 million) and flood relief aids.
