= 2017 Pacific hurricane season =

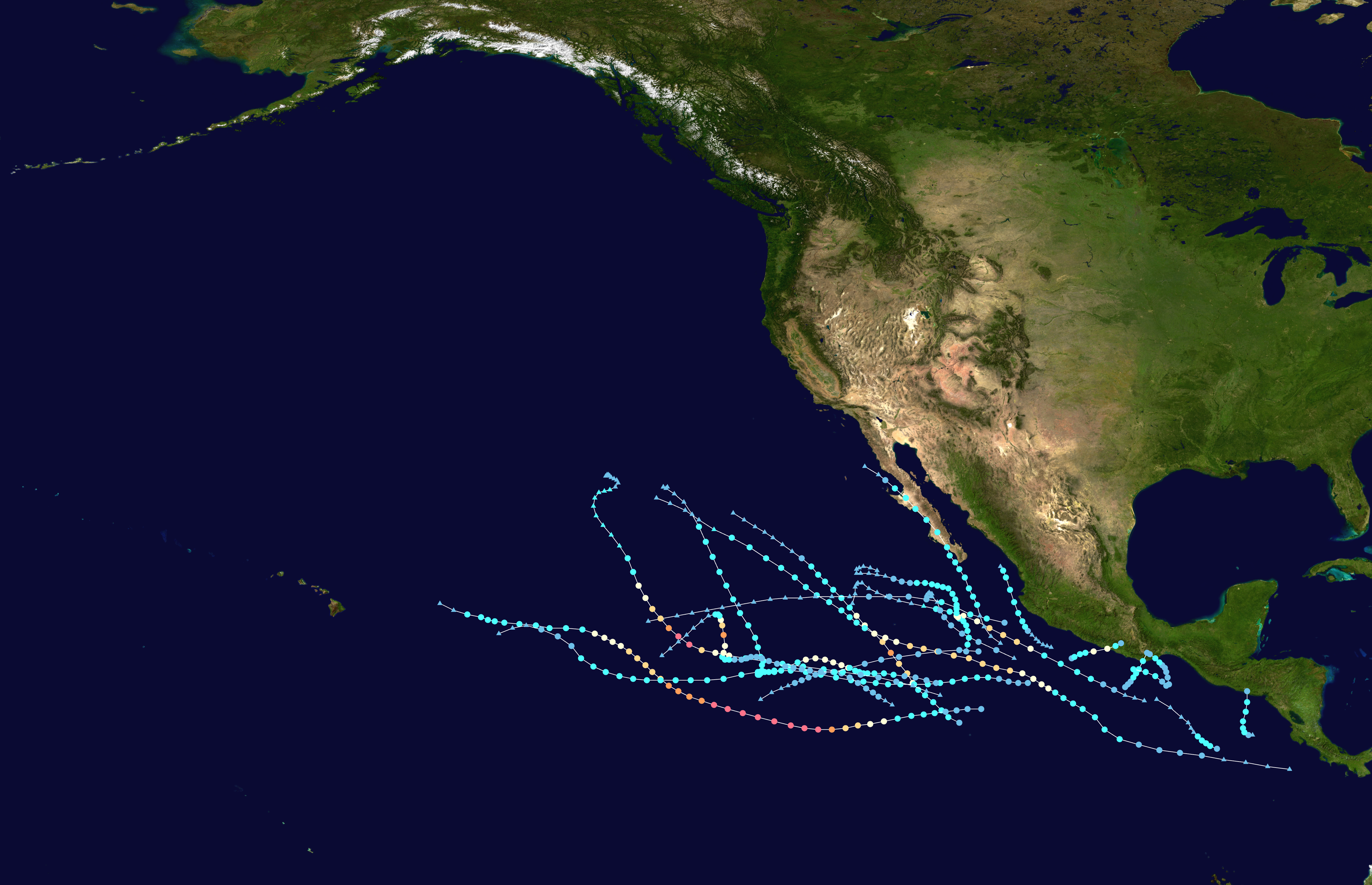
- Season summary map

Seasonal boundaries
- First system formed: May 9, 2017
- Last system dissipated: October 28, 2017

Strongest storm
- Name: Fernanda
  - Maximum winds: 145 mph (230 km/h) (1-minute sustained)
  - Lowest pressure: 948 mbar (hPa; 27.99 inHg)

Seasonal statistics
- Total depressions: 20
- Total storms: 18
- Hurricanes: 9
- Major hurricanes (Cat. 3+): 4
- ACE: 100.8
- Total fatalities: 48 total
- Total damage: $375.28 million (2017 USD)

Related articles
- Timeline of the 2017 Pacific hurricane season; 2017 Atlantic hurricane season; 2017 Pacific typhoon season; 2017 North Indian Ocean cyclone season

The 2017 Pacific hurricane season was an above average Pacific hurricane season in terms of named storms, (Note: An average Pacific hurricane season, as defined by the National Oceanic and Atmospheric Administration, has fifteen tropical storms, seven hurricanes and three major hurricanes.) though less active than the previous three, featuring eighteen named storms, nine hurricanes, and four major hurricanes. (Note: Hurricanes reaching Category 3 (111 miles per hour or 179 kilometers per hour) and higher on the five-level Saffir–Simpson wind speed scale are considered major hurricanes.) Despite the considerable amount of activity, most of the storms were weak and short-lived. The season officially started on May 15 in the eastern Pacific Ocean, and on June 1 in the central Pacific; they both ended on November 30. These dates conventionally delimit the period of each year when most tropical cyclones form in the respective regions. However, the formation of tropical cyclones is possible at any time of the year, as illustrated in 2017 by the formation of the season's first named storm, Tropical Storm Adrian, on May 9. At the time, this was the earliest formation of a tropical storm on record in the eastern Pacific basin proper (east of 140°W). The season saw near-average activity in terms of accumulated cyclone energy (ACE), in stark contrast to the extremely active seasons in 2014, 2015, and 2016; and for the first time since 2012, no tropical cyclones formed in the Central Pacific basin. However, for the third year in a row, the season featured above-average activity in July, with the ACE value being the fifth highest for the month. Damage across the basin reached $375.28 million (2017 USD), (Note: All damage totals are valued as of 2017 and in United States dollars, unless otherwise noted.) while 45 people were killed by the various storms.

Prior to the start of this season, the National Hurricane Center (NHC) changed its policy to permit issuance of advisories on disturbances that were not yet tropical cyclones but had a high chance to become one, and were expected to bring tropical storm or hurricane conditions to landmasses within 48 hours. As a result of this change, watches and warnings could be issued by local authorities. Such systems would be termed as "Potential Tropical Cyclones". The first system to receive this designation was Potential Tropical Cyclone Fourteen-E, which developed into Tropical Storm Lidia south-southeast of the Baja California Peninsula on August 30.

== Seasonal forecasts ==
Record		Named storms	Hurricanes	Major hurricanes	Ref
Average (1981–2010):		15.4	7.6	3.2	
Record high activity:		1992: 27	2015: 16	2015: 11	
Record low activity:		2010: 8	2010: 3	2003: 0	
Date	Source	Named storms	Hurricanes	Major hurricanes	Ref
May 25, 2017	NOAA	14–20	6–11	3–7	
May 29, 2017	SMN	16	10	6	
	Area	Named storms	Hurricanes	Major hurricanes	Ref
Actual activity:	EPAC	18	9	4	
Actual activity:	CPAC	0	0	0	
Actual activity:		18	9	4	

Forecasts include weekly and monthly changes in important factors that help determine the number of tropical storms, hurricanes, and major hurricanes within a particular year. According to the National Oceanic and Atmospheric Administration (NOAA), the average hurricane season in the Eastern and Central Pacific between 1981 and 2010 contained approximately 15 tropical storms, 7 hurricanes, and 3 major hurricanes. The NOAA generally classifies a season as above average, average, or below average based on the cumulative ACE index, but occasionally the number of tropical storms, hurricanes, and major hurricanes within a hurricane season is also considered.

On May 25, 2017, the National Oceanic and Atmospheric Administration released its annual forecast, predicting an 80% chance of a near- to above-average season in both the Eastern and Central Pacific basins, with a total of 14–20 named storms, 6–11 hurricanes, and 3–7 major hurricanes. (Note: A major hurricane is a storm that ranks as Category 3 or higher on the Saffir–Simpson scale.) During May 28, the Servicio Meteorológico Nacional (SMN) issued its first forecast for the season, predicting a total of 16 named storms, 10 hurricanes, and 6 major hurricanes to develop.

== Seasonal summary ==
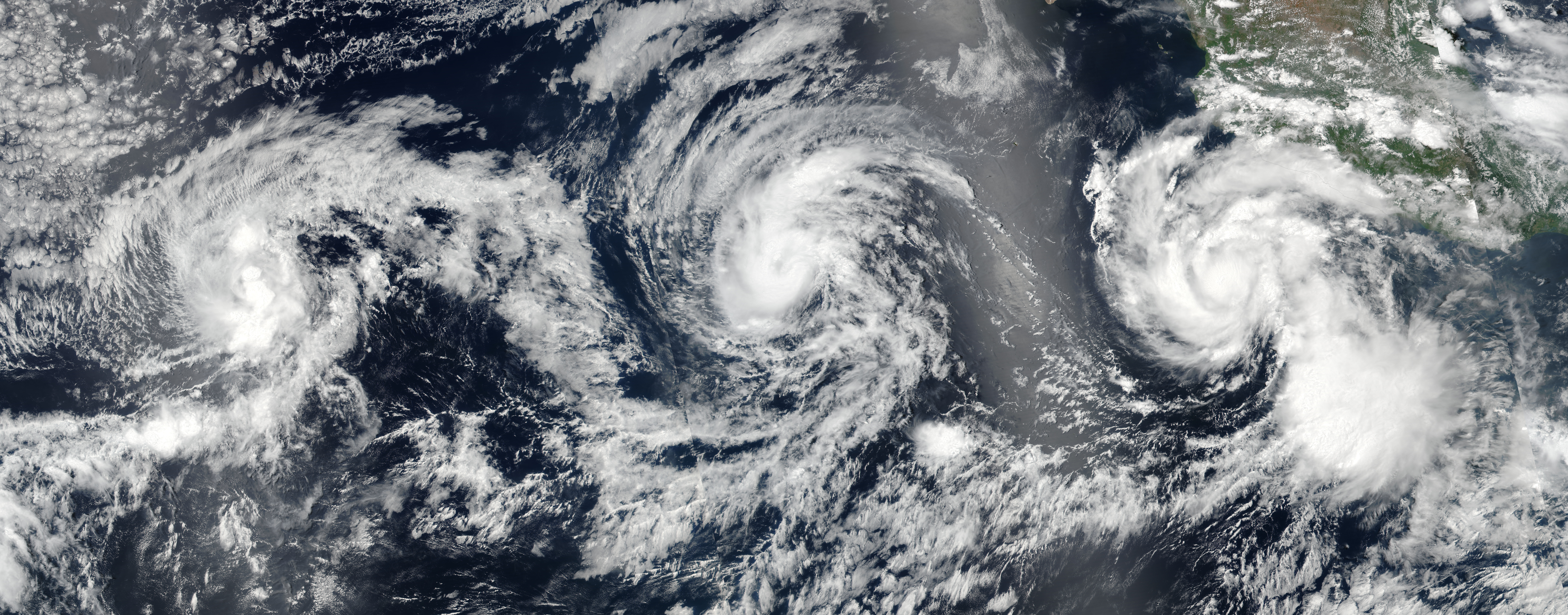
Tropical Storms Greg (left), Irwin (center), and Hurricane Hilary (right) spanning the East Pacific on July 24

Although hurricane season in the eastern Pacific does not officially begin until May 15, and on June 1 in the central Pacific, activity began several days prior with the formation of a tropical depression in the eastern region on May 9. This was the earliest formation of a tropical cyclone on record in the eastern Pacific basin proper, until broken by Tropical Depression One-E in 2020. When it intensified into Tropical Storm Adrian a few hours later, the system became the earliest named storm on record in the region, a record that stood until broken by Tropical Storm Andres in 2021. Near normal activity occurred in June, with Tropical Storm Calvin formed on June 11, and Hurricane Dora on June 25. For the third year in a row, July featured above average activity, with the fifth highest ACE value for that month on record. This total was due to long-lived hurricanes Eugene, Fernanda, Hilary, and Irwin. August saw significantly less activity, with only three storms forming in the month; however it featured Hurricane Kenneth, the third major hurricane of the season. September featured four storms, including Hurricane Otis, which became the fourth major hurricane of the season. Only two storms formed after October 1, Ramon and Selma. Both did not attain hurricane status, though Selma became the first and last storm to make landfall in El Salvador. No systems were active in November for the first time since the 2010 season. The Accumulated Cyclone Energy index for the 2017 Pacific hurricane season as calculated by Colorado State University using data from the National Hurricane Center was approximately 100.7 units, (Note: The total represents the sum of the squares of the maximum sustained wind speed (knots) for every (sub)tropical storm's intensity of over 33 knots (38 mph; 61 km/h), divided by 10,000 while they are above that threshold; therefore, tropical depressions are not included.) about 20 percent near average.

== Systems ==
=== Tropical Storm Adrian ===
- Tropical storm (SSHWS)
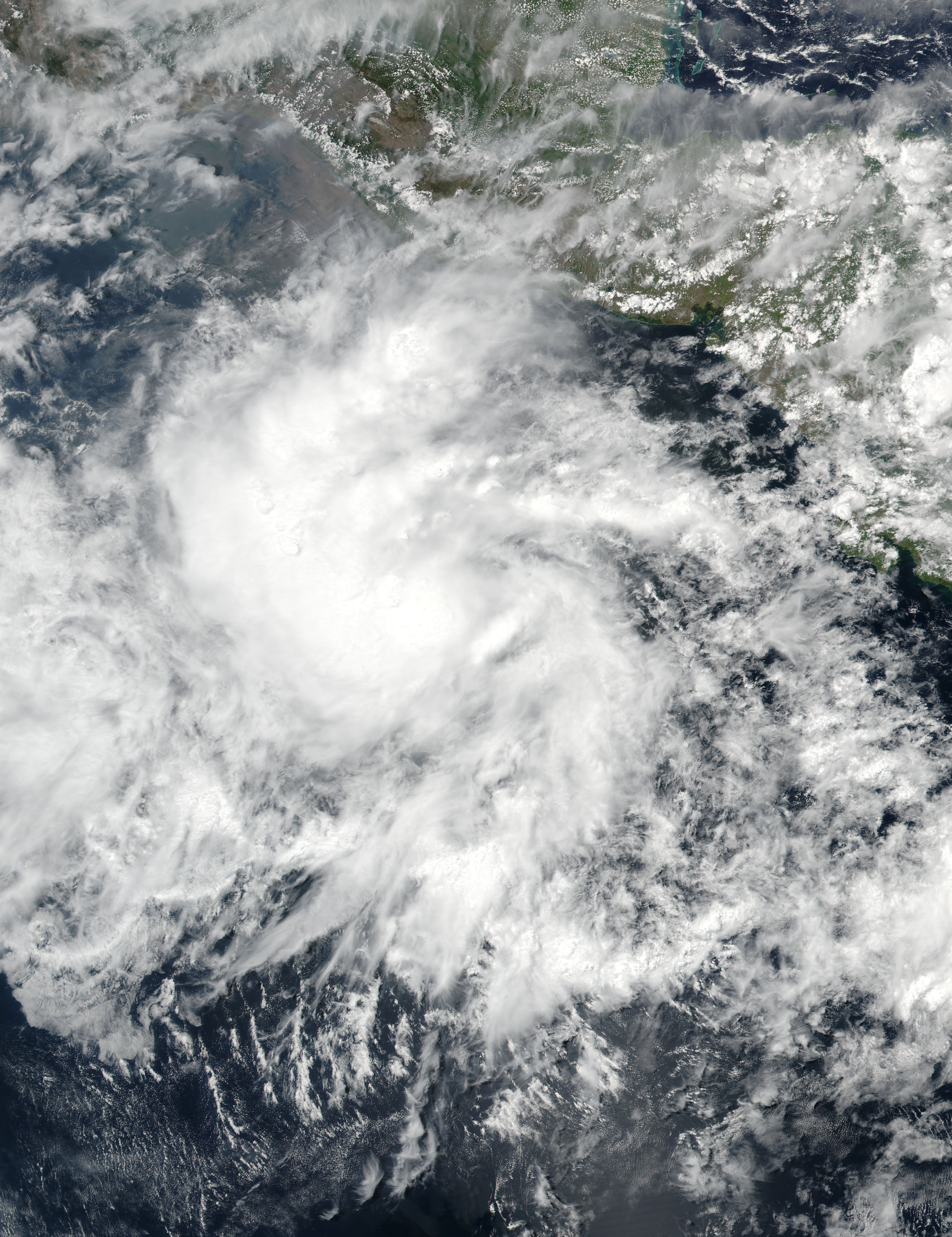
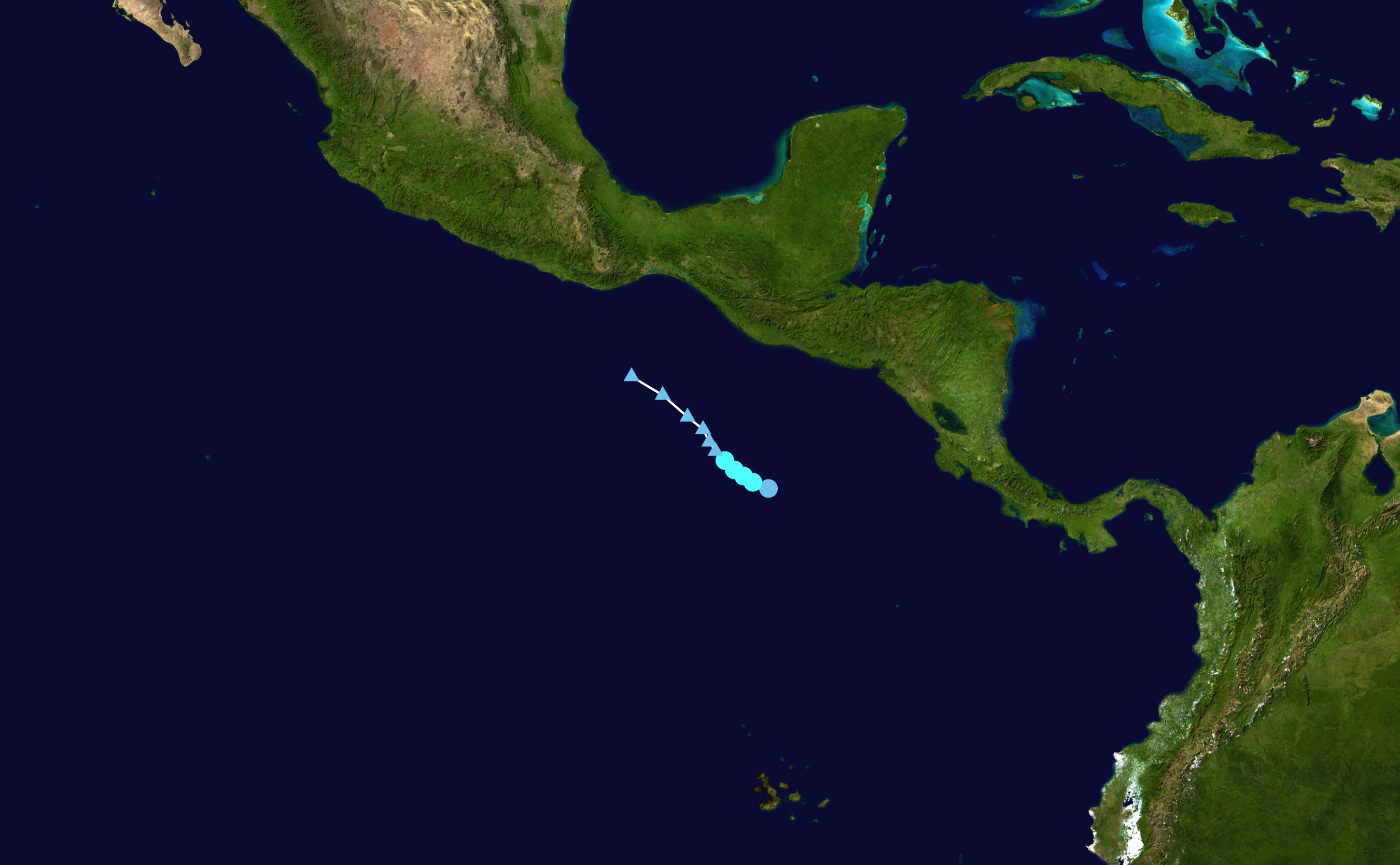
- Duration: May 9 – May 10
- Peak intensity: 45 mph (75 km/h) (1-min); 1004 mbar (hPa)

Between May 5–6, a tehuantepecer occurred over the East Pacific, enhancing cyclonic spin over the eastern reaches of the basin. A tropical wave was first identified over Panama around the same time, and it interacted with the gap wind event on its westward trek. The disturbance gradually organized, becoming the season's first tropical depression around 18:00 UTC on May 9 while located about 275 nmi (315 mi; 510 km) south-southwest of the El Salvador–Guatemala border. At the time, it was the earliest tropical cyclone on record in the East Pacific. Six hours later, it intensified into Tropical Storm Adrian. Satellite imagery depicted a well-organized tropical storm with a mid-level eye feature, and Adrian attained peak winds of 40 kn (45 mph; 75 km/h) early on May 10. Although forecasters initially expected Adrian to become a hurricane, the influence of mid-level southeasterly wind shear was poorly modeled. Thunderstorm activity became increasingly displaced from the cyclone's center, and it weakened. By 00:00 UTC on May 11, Adrian degenerated to a remnant low. It moved northwestward and dissipated offshore the Mexico coastline the next day.

=== Tropical Storm Beatriz ===
- Tropical storm (SSHWS)
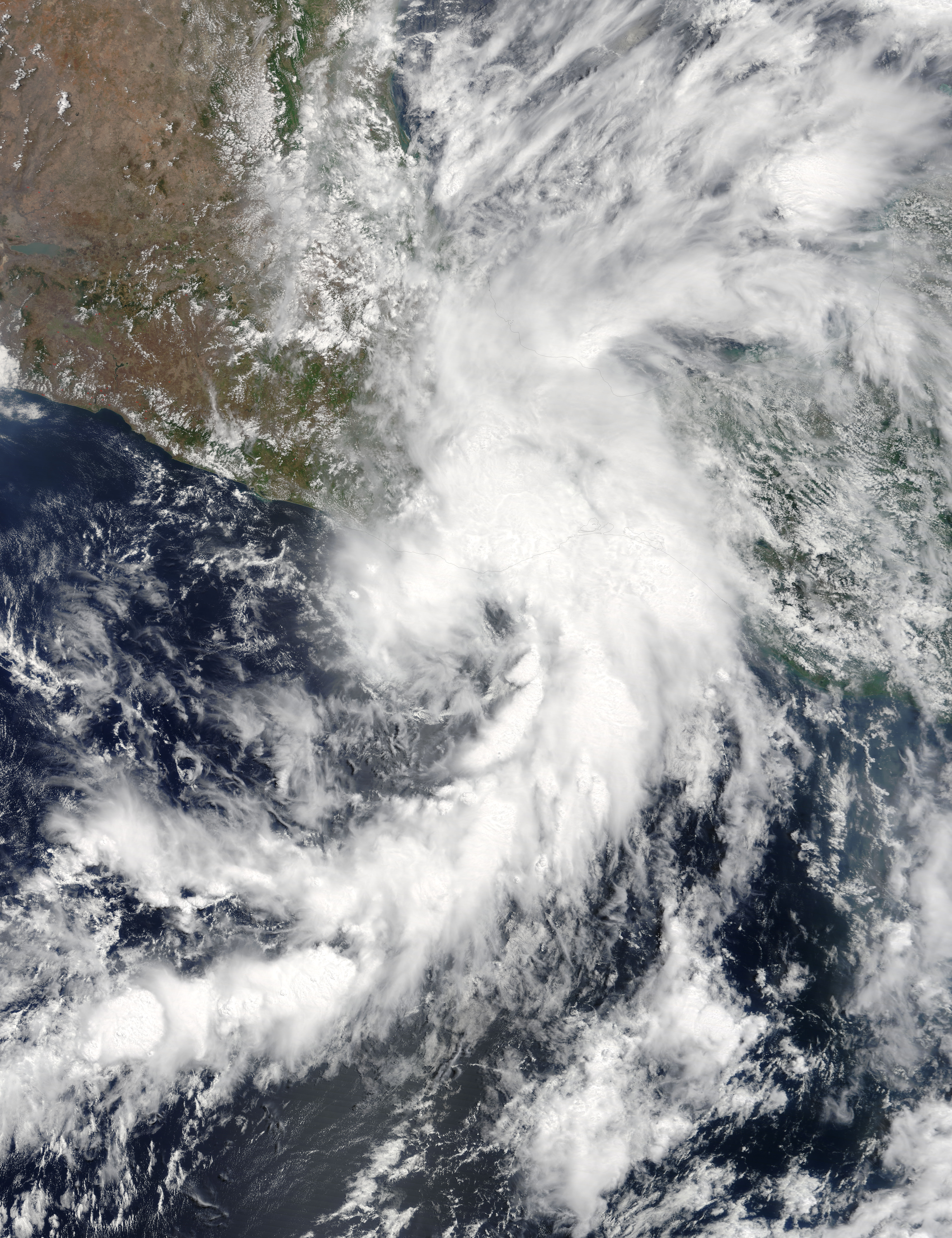
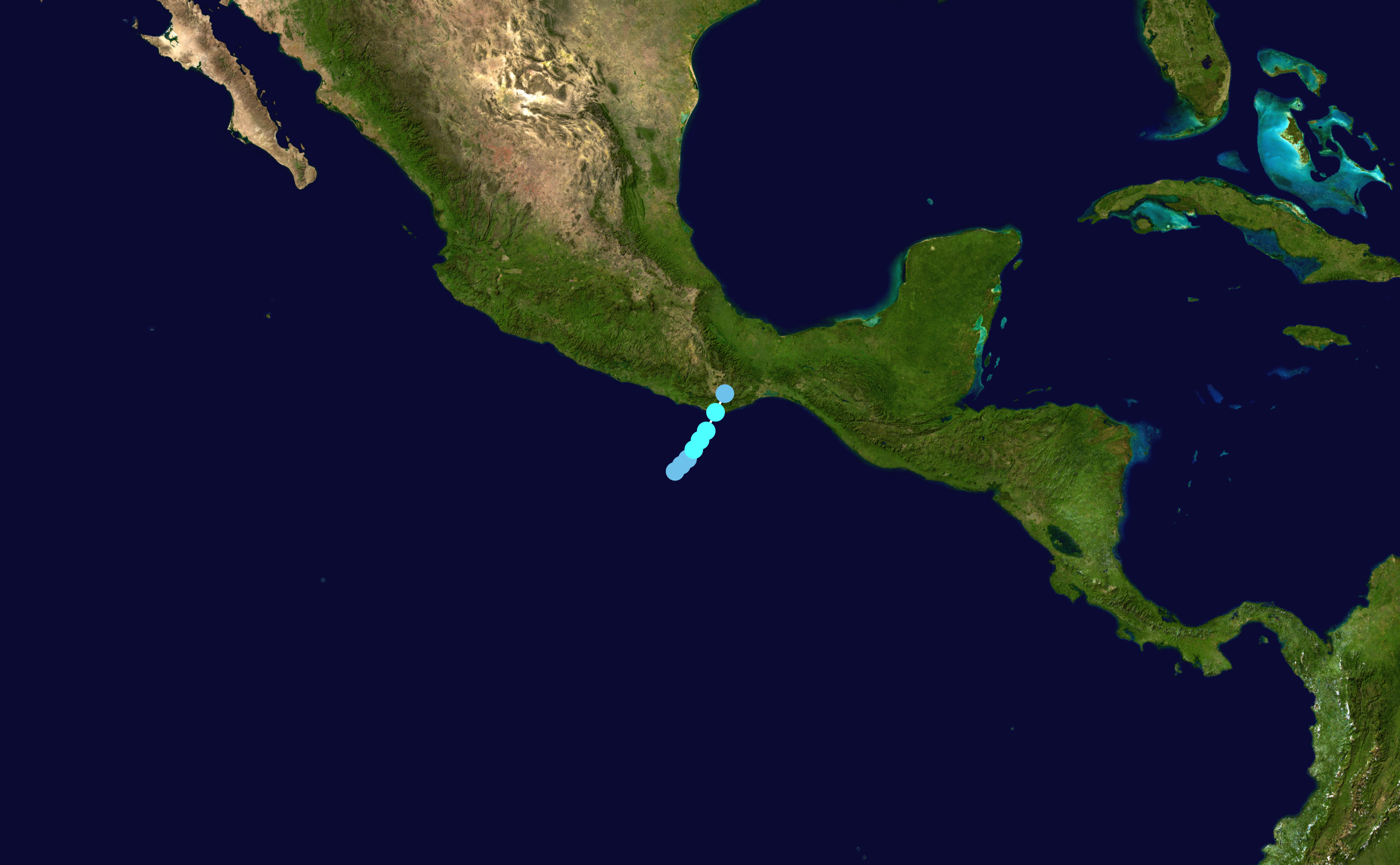
- Duration: May 31 – June 2
- Peak intensity: 45 mph (75 km/h) (1-min); 1001 mbar (hPa)

A tropical wave emerged off the western coast of Africa on May 18 and entered the East Pacific about a week later, where steady organization led to the formation of a tropical depression around 12:00 UTC on May 31. Embedded within southwesterly flow around a large upper-level trough across northern Mexico, the depression moved steadily northeast in a favorable environment, and it intensified into Tropical Storm Beatriz by 06:00 UTC on June 1. After attaining peak winds of 45 mph (70 km/h), the system made landfall around 00:00 UTC on June 2 about 25 miles (40 km) west of Puerto Ángel before the mountainous terrain of Mexico quickly made Beatriz dissipate inland twelve hours later.

In the state of Oaxaca, flights out of Bahías de Huatulco International Airport were cancelled and schools were closed until June 3. Dozens of roads were impassable due to mudslides and flooding; numerous locales received over 4 in (100 mm) of rain, with rainfall at a maximum of 19.07 in (484 mm) in Huatulco. Numerous landslides caused significant disruption across the state; the storm blocked large areas of Federal Highway 200 in Oaxaca. A landslide in San Marcial Ozolotepec killed two girls and buried several houses, while another in San Carlos Yautepec killed a woman. As of June 4, a total of six people have been killed—five in Oaxaca and two in Tehuantepec. Damage in Oaxaca reached MXN$3.2 billion (US$172 million).

=== Tropical Storm Calvin ===
- Tropical storm (SSHWS)
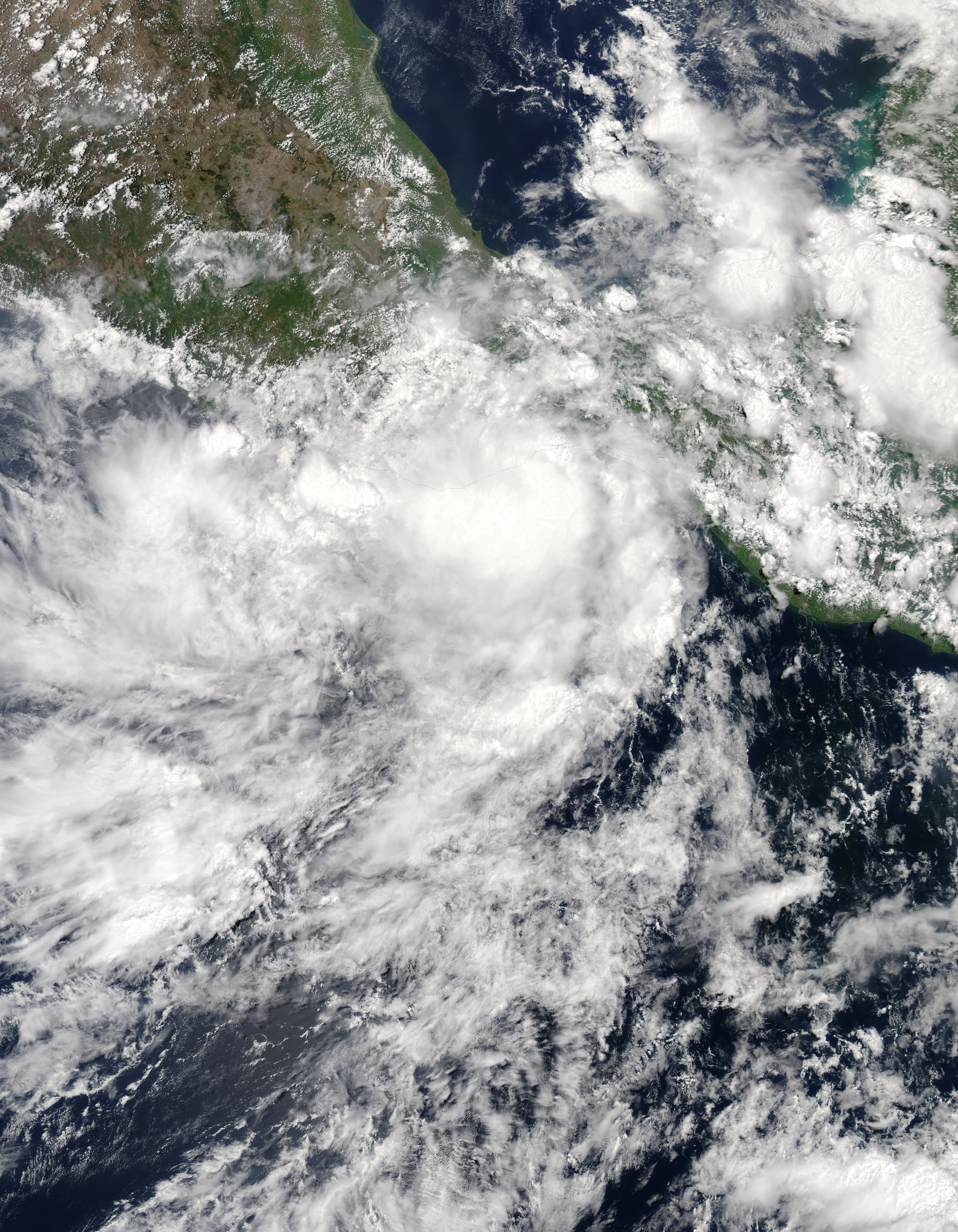
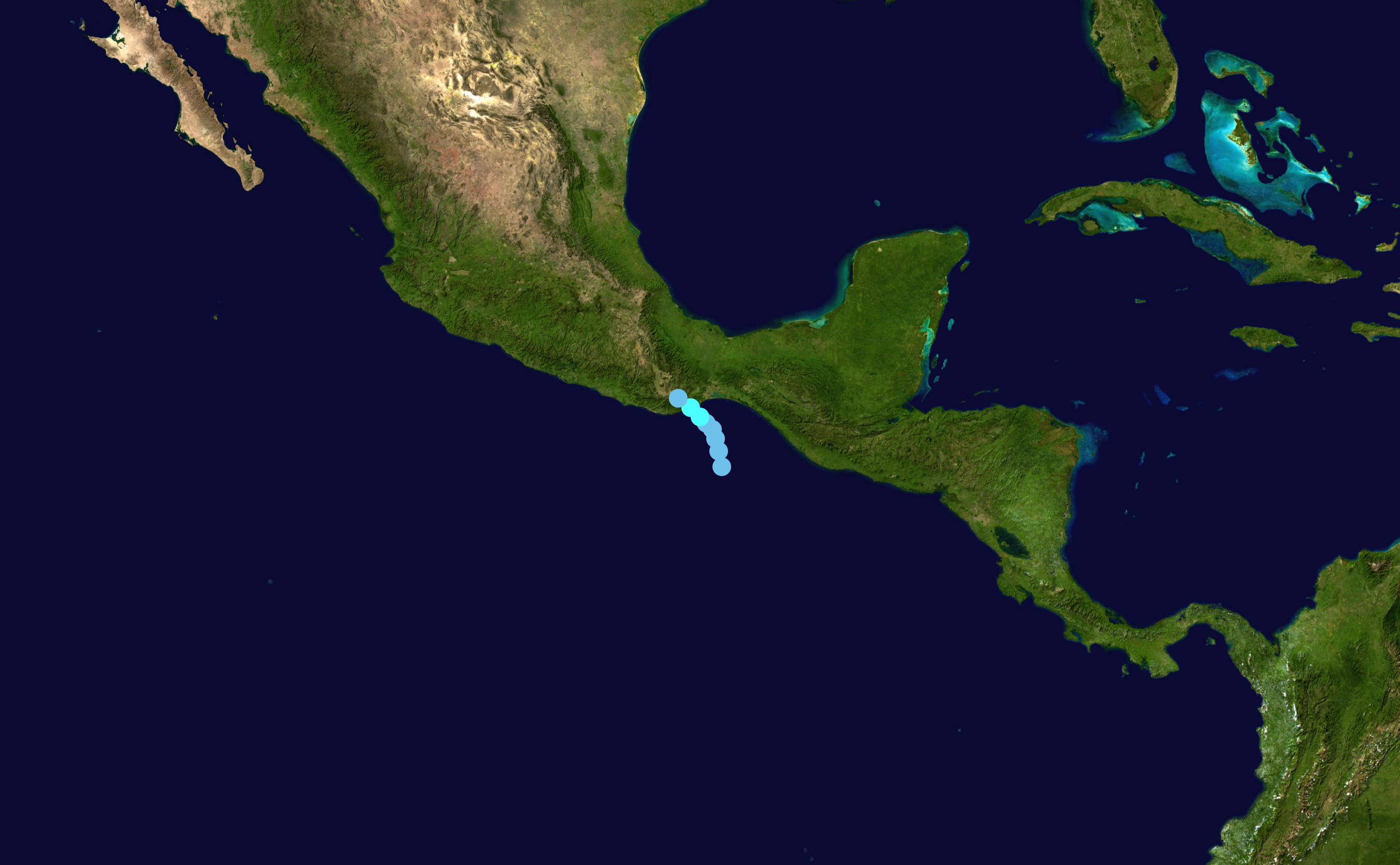
- Duration: June 11 – June 13
- Peak intensity: 45 mph (75 km/h) (1-min); 1004 mbar (hPa)

In the second week of June, the NHC forecast the development of a broad area of low pressure a few hundred miles south of Mexico over the next several days. This prediction came to fruition on June 9, and the fledgling disturbance steadily organized into a tropical depression by 12:00 UTC on June 11 while located about 150 mi (240 km) south-southeast of Salina Cruz. It was slow to organize initially due to moderate easterly wind shear as it drifted northwestwards; by 18:00 UTC on June 12, however, the tropical depression intensified into Tropical Storm Calvin. Intensifying slightly to reach winds of 45 mph (70 km/h), Calvin made landfall halfway between Salina Cruz and Puerto Ángel, near Paja Blanca, around 00:00 UTC on June 13. Just 12 hours later, Calvin dissipated into a remnant low. The remnants of the storm caused heavy rainfall and some flooding in the area, however no fatalities were reported. Calvin affected proximate areas of Mexico as Tropical Storm Beatriz less than two weeks earlier, causing at least 70 million pesos (US$3.88 million) additional damage in Oaxaca.

=== Hurricane Dora ===
- Category 2 hurricane (SSHWS)
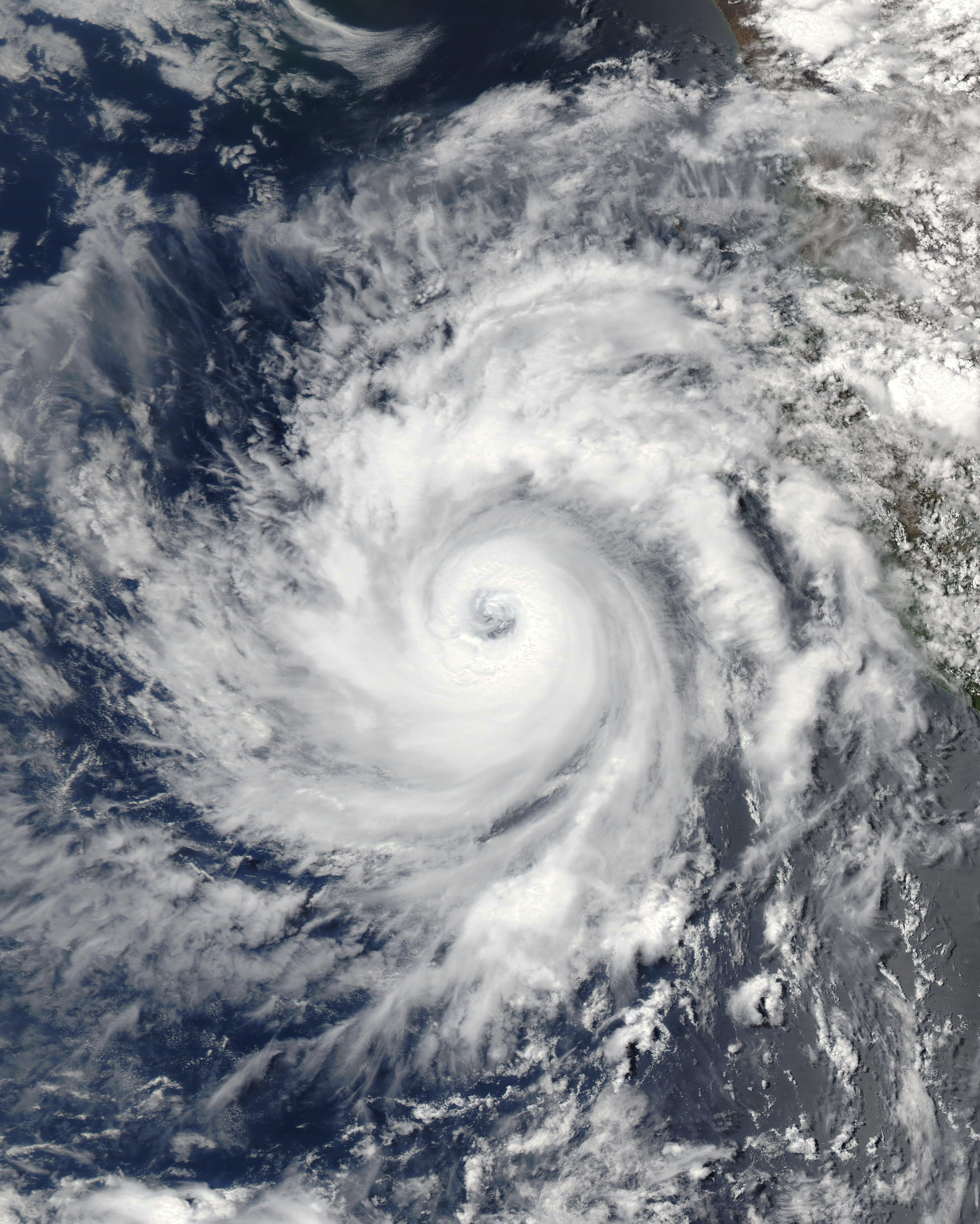
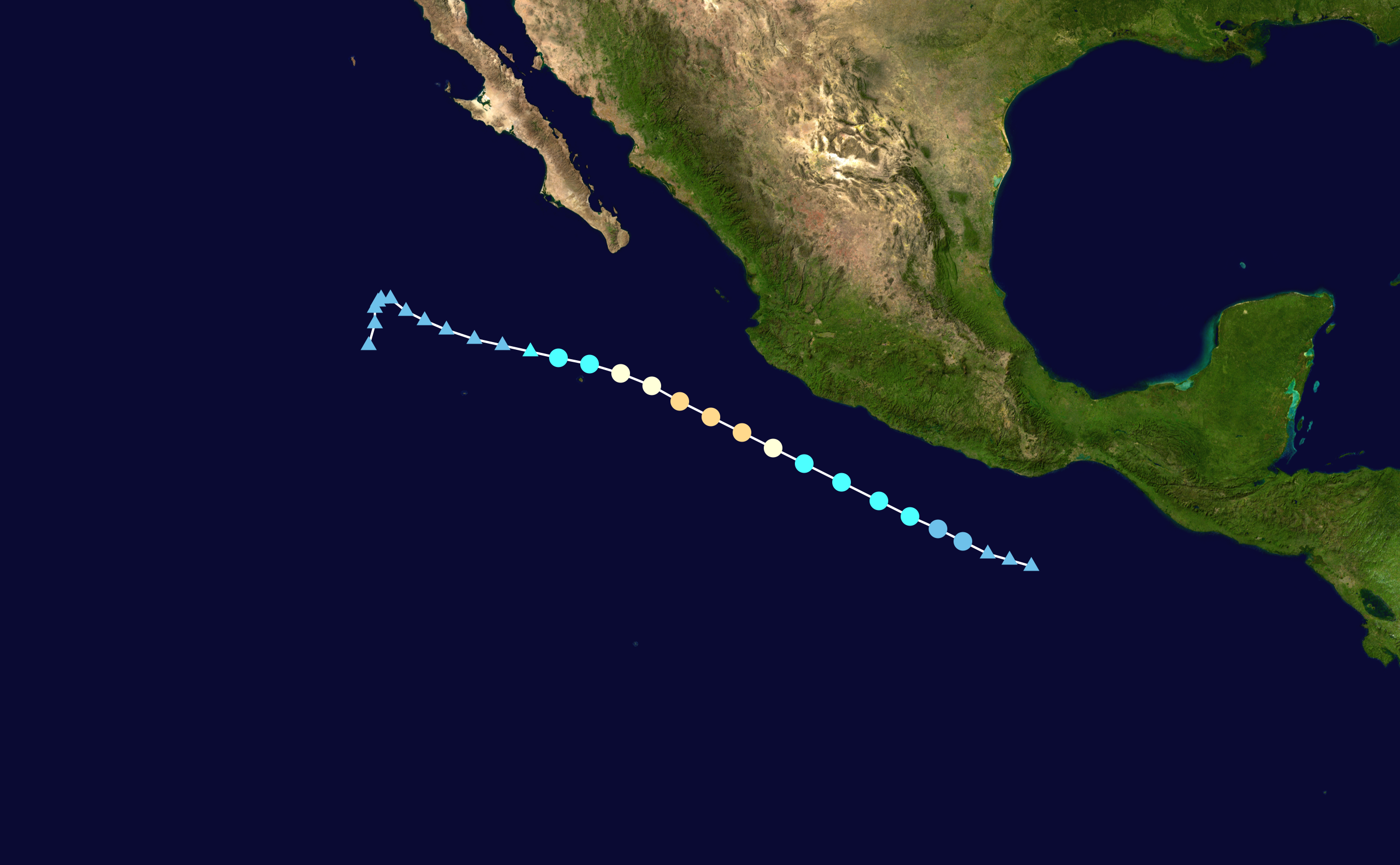
- Duration: June 24 – June 28
- Peak intensity: 105 mph (165 km/h) (1-min); 974 mbar (hPa)

A large gyre developed over Central America around June 15. A trough detached from the gyre and drifted across just south of the Gulf of Tehuantepec between June 21 and June 23. By June 23, a tropical wave associated with the remnants of Tropical Storm Bret in the Atlantic began merging with the trough. A surface low formed early on the next day, followed by the development of a tropical depression at 18:00 UTC. Initially located about 230 mi (370 km) south-southeast of Acapulco, the depression moved west-northwestward due to a mid-tropospheric ridge, which stretched from northern Mexico westward into nearby Pacific waters. At 06:00 UTC on June 25, the depression intensified into Tropical Storm Dora. Thereafter, favorable conditions including low wind shear and warm sea surface temperatures allowed Dora to undergo rapid intensification, becoming a hurricane at 06:00 UTC on June 26 and a Category 2 hurricane about six hours later.

With impressive outflow and an eye apparent on satellite imagery, the storm peaked with maximum sustained winds of 105 mph (170 km/h) and a minimum barometric pressure of 974 mbar (28.8 inHg) by 18:00 UTC June 26. Dora remained a Category 2 hurricane for about 12 more hours before beginning to rapidly weaken over cooler sea surface temperatures and in an environment of drier air, falling to Category 1 intensity at 06:00 UTC on June 27 and deteriorating to a tropical storm around 18:00 UTC. The storm later degenerated into a remnant low near Socorro Island early on June 28, after all of the storm's convection had been diminished. The remnant low moved slowly over the eastern Pacific before dissipating early on July 1. The outer bands of Dora brought heavy rains to Guerrero, resulting in flash floods that inundated 20 homes. Overall damage was minor, however.

=== Hurricane Eugene ===
- Category 3 hurricane (SSHWS)
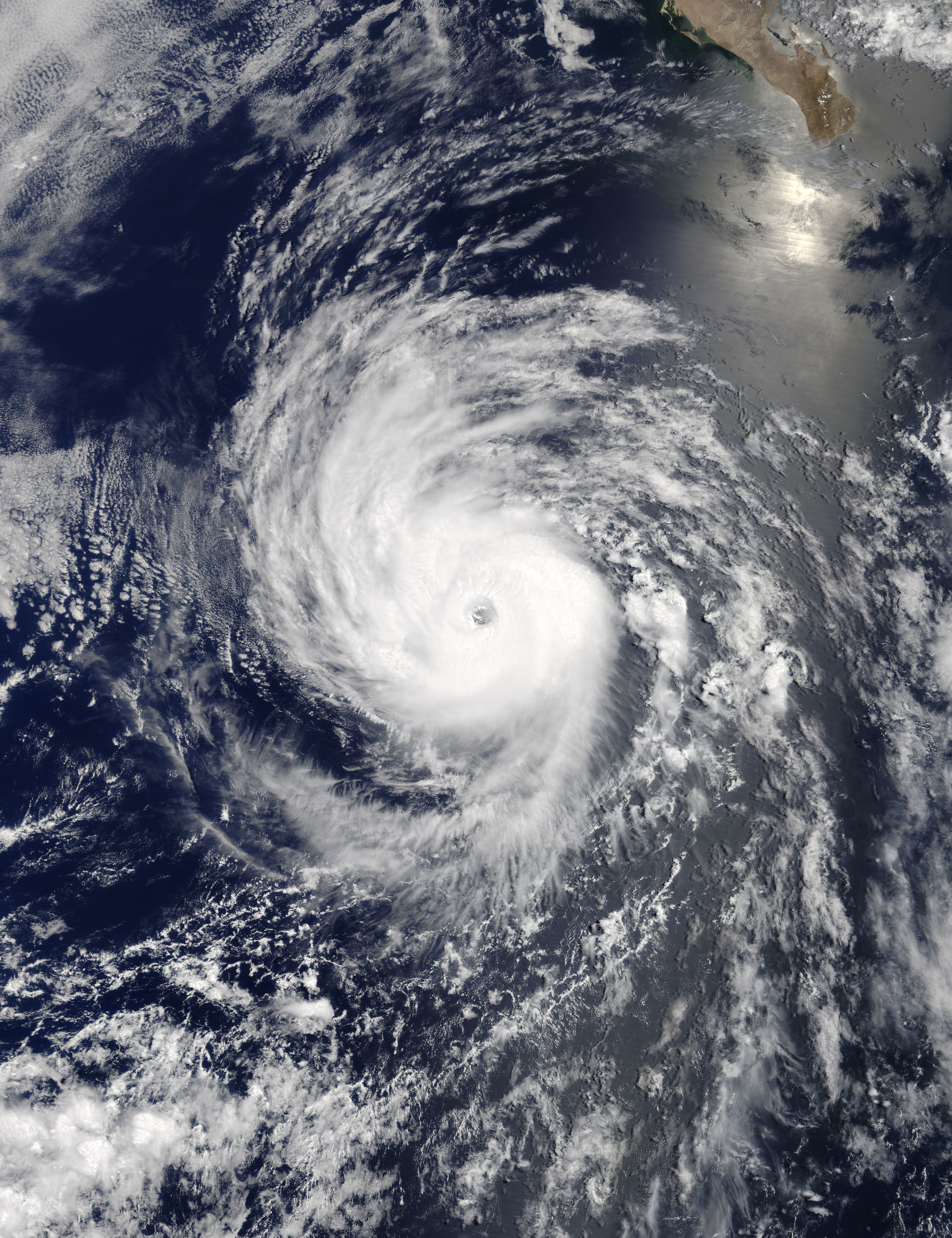
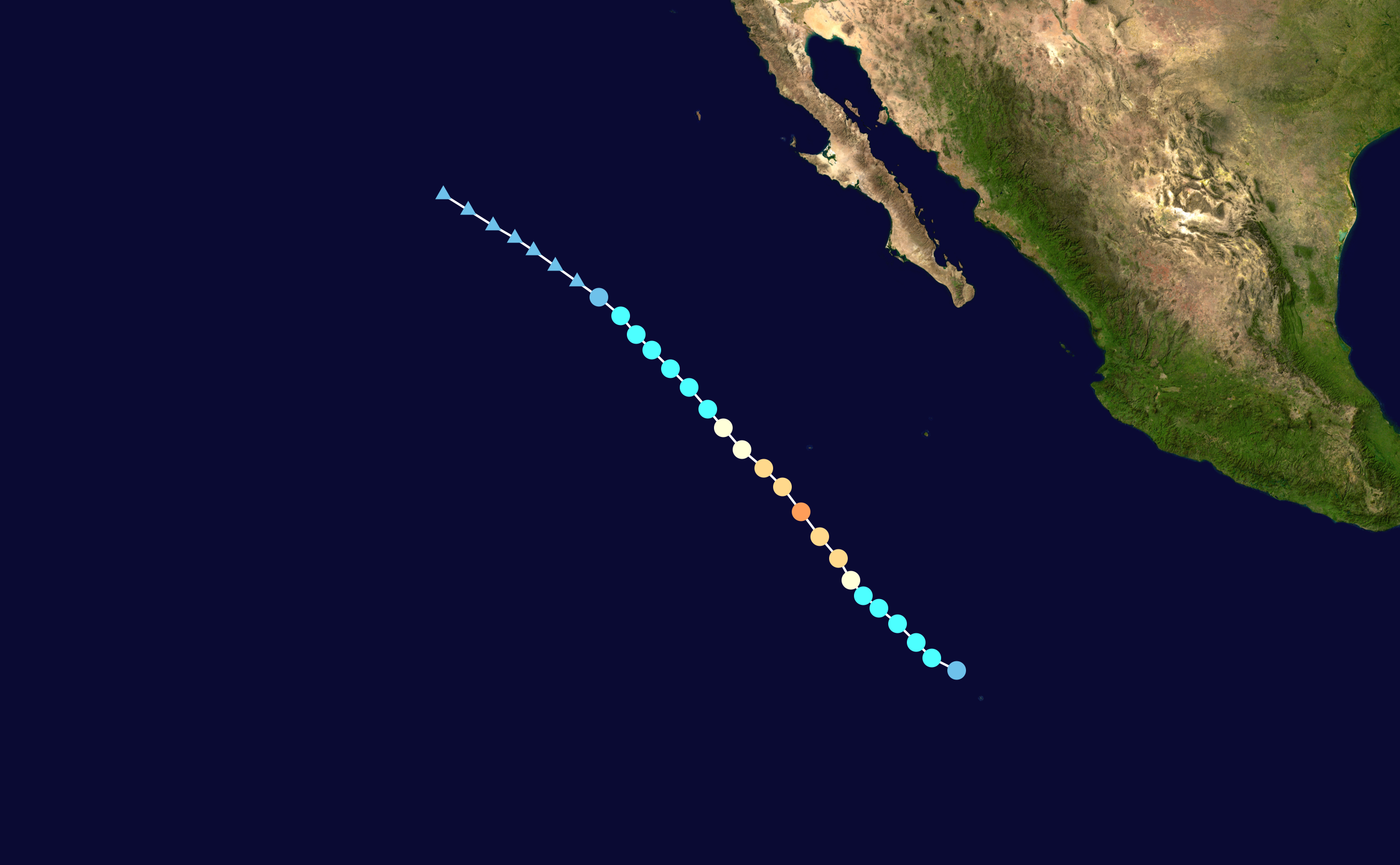
- Duration: July 7 – July 12
- Peak intensity: 115 mph (185 km/h) (1-min); 966 mbar (hPa)

A tropical wave emerged from Africa on June 25 and moved across the Atlantic before reaching the East Pacific on July 2. Shower and thunderstorm activity, previously lacking, began to gradually increase as the disturbance interacted with a convectively-coupled kelvin wave. Around 12:00 UTC on July 7, it organized into a tropical depression while located about 700 nmi (805 mi; 1,295 km) south of the southern tip of the Baja California peninsula. The cyclone intensified into Tropical Storm Eugene six hours later. A stout ridge over the Southwestern United States directed the storm toward the northwest, and a favorable combination of warm waters, low wind shear, and adequate moisture facilitated its rapid intensification. In the 42 hours between 00:00 UTC July 8 and 18:00 UTC July 9, Eugene strengthened from a 35 kn (40 mph; 65 km/h) tropical storm to a 100 kn (115 mph; 185 km/h) Category 3 hurricane. It exhibited a clear eye surrounded by very deep convection around this time. However, the steering ridge quickly directed the hurricane into colder waters on July 10, and within a 30-hour period, Eugene weakened from a major hurricane back to a tropical storm. It degenerated to a remnant low around 18:00 UTC on July 12. The circulation dissipated well west of Baja California two days later.

Dangerous rip currents combined with swells of 4 to 8 ft (1.2 to 2.4 m) across southern California resulted in hundreds of rescues. On July 10 alone, lifeguards in Huntington Beach made 200 rescues while 600 were made in Los Angeles County; lifeguards also responded to 700 medical emergencies.

=== Hurricane Fernanda ===
- Category 4 hurricane (SSHWS)
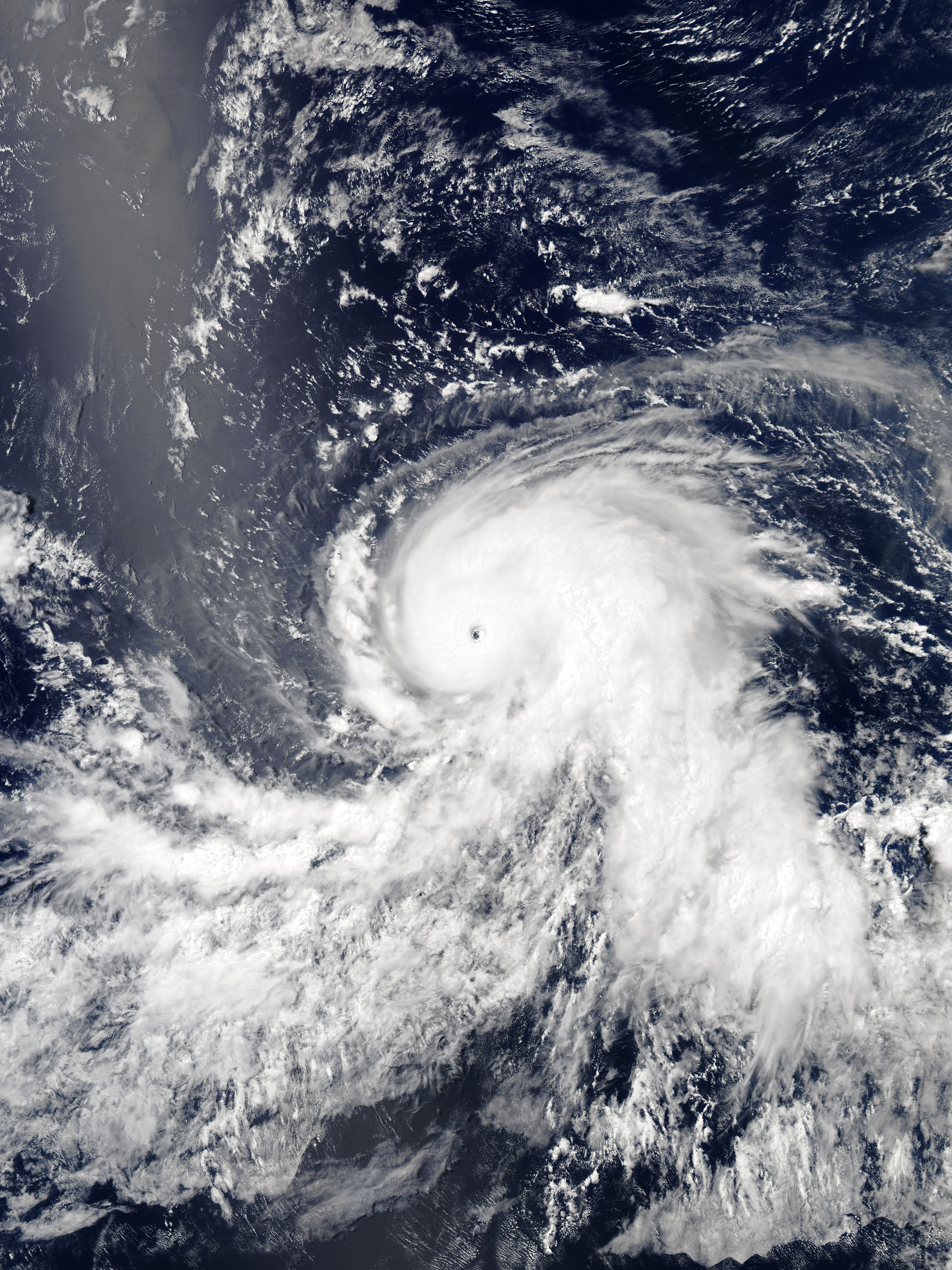
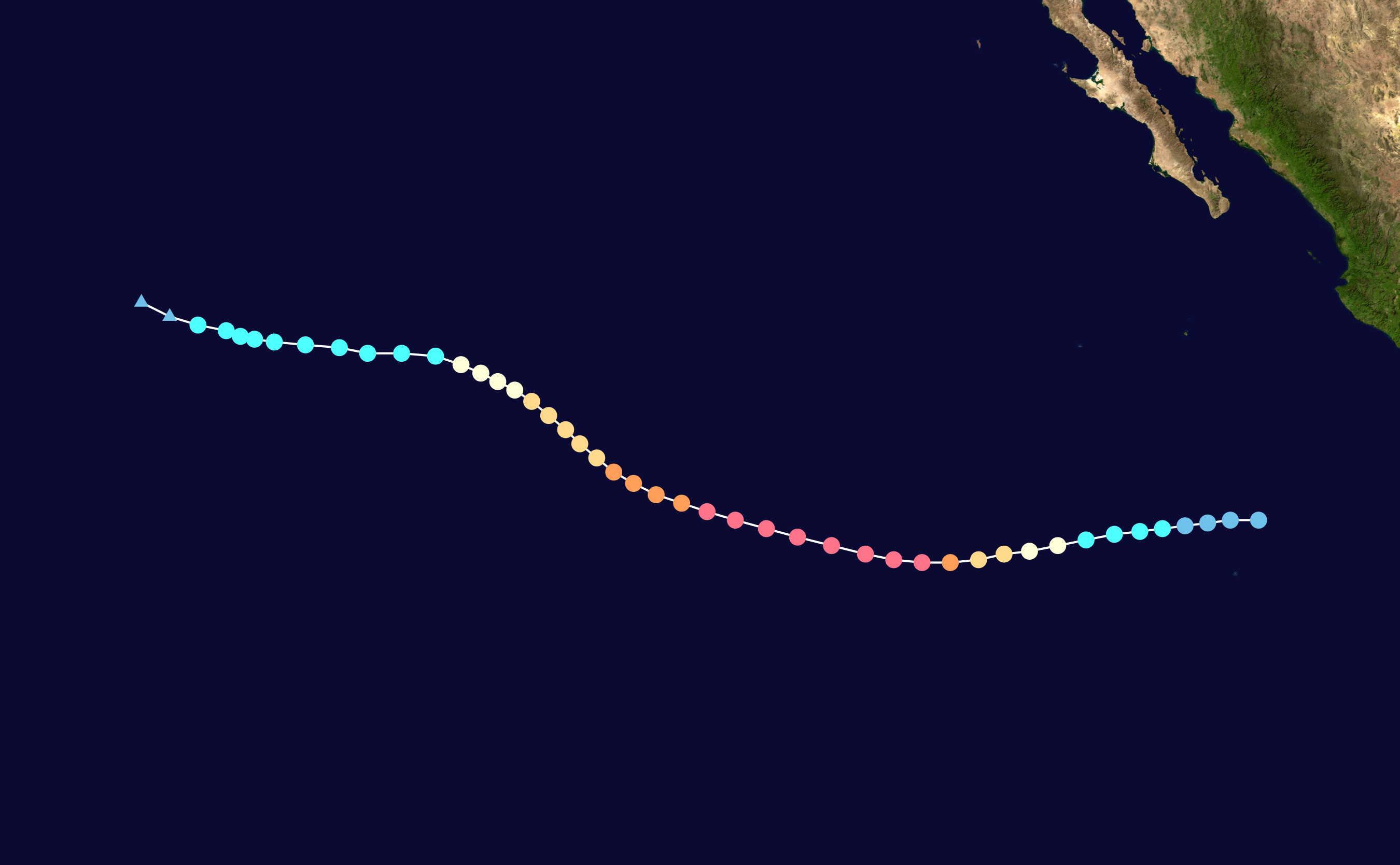
- Duration: July 12 – July 22
- Peak intensity: 145 mph (230 km/h) (1-min); 948 mbar (hPa)

A tropical wave moved offshore Africa on June 26 and remained disorganized as it entered the East Pacific on July 5. There, a broad area of low pressure formed well south of Mexico, and associated shower and thunderstorm activity began to increase as the disturbance continued westward. This resulted in the formation of a tropical depression around 18:00 UTC on July 11 while located about 650 nmi (750 mi; 1,205 km) south of the southern tip of the Baja California peninsula. Its formation was unexpected by forecasters because of poor performance from reliable computer models; it was only given a low chance of development 18 hours before genesis. A day later, the system intensified into Tropical Storm Fernanda. A potent mid-level ridge over western North America caused the newly formed storm to lose latitude, while a very favorable environment triggered its prolonged rapid intensification. In 54 hours, Fernanda intensified from a 35 kn (40 mph; 65 km/h) tropical storm to a 125 kn (145 mph; 230 km/h) Category 4 hurricane. The system exhibited a clear eye surrounded by −70 °C (−95 °F) cloud tops and plentiful spiral banding around this time. The powerful hurricane maintained a protracted peak intensity even while undergoing an eyewall replacement cycle. However, Fernanda eventually shifted to the northwest, bringing it into colder waters that triggered weakening beginning on July 18. The increasingly disheveled storm, feeling the effects of increased wind shear, crossed into the Central Pacific on July 20–21. Fernanda degenerated to a remnant low around 18:00 UTC on July 22 while it was positioned about 430 nmi (495 mi; 795 km) east of the Big Island. The low dissipated several hours later.

=== Tropical Depression Eight-E ===
- Tropical depression (SSHWS)
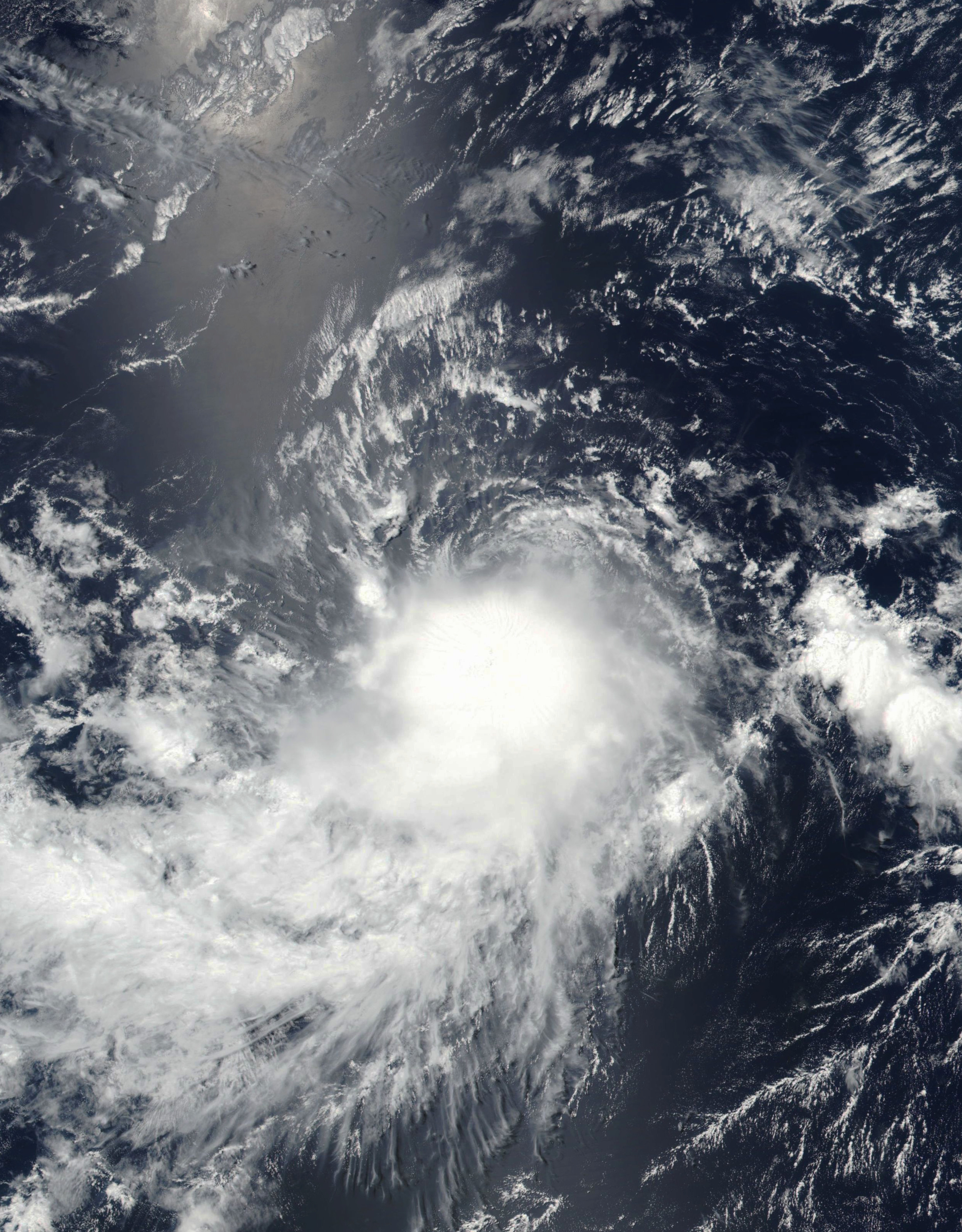
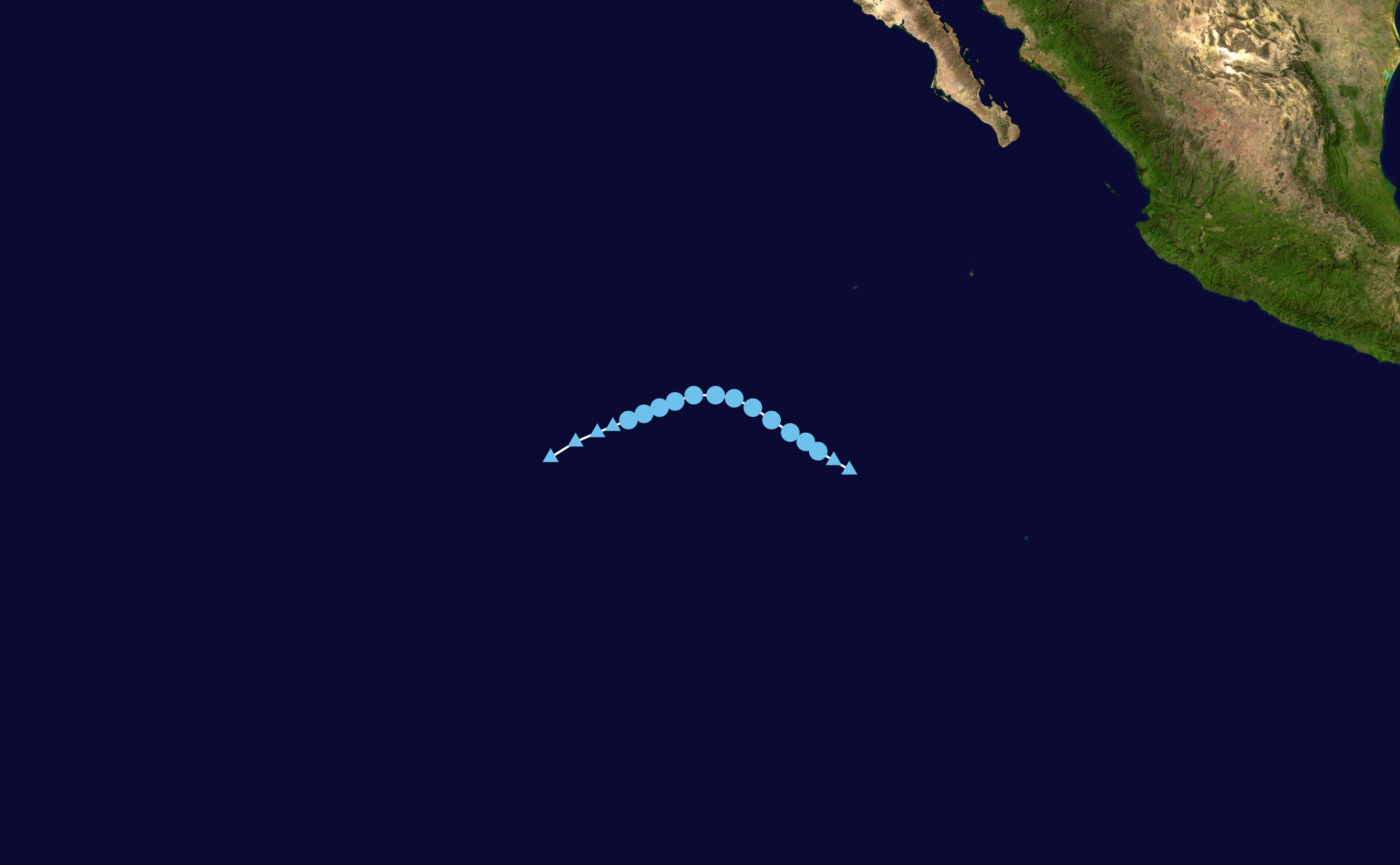
- Duration: July 17 – July 20
- Peak intensity: 35 mph (55 km/h) (1-min); 1007 mbar (hPa)

A tropical wave left Africa on June 28–29, producing a weak area of low pressure but otherwise remaining disorganized until reaching the East Pacific on July 9–10. The disturbance intersected the favorable phase of the Madden–Julian Oscillation and began to gradually organize. Around 06:00 UTC on July 17, it developed into a tropical depression while located about 680 nmi (785 mi; 1,260 km) south-southwest of the southern tip of the Baja California peninsula. The formation of the system was not well-anticipated due to ongoing vertical wind shear that was expected to curb its organization. Atmospheric conditions did not become any more hospitable as the newly formed cyclone first moved west-northwest and then west-southwest. Hurricane Fernanda to the west and Tropical Storm Greg to the east stripped the tropical depression of its inflow as well. Accordingly, it degenerated to a remnant low around 06:00 UTC on July 20. The remnant circulation dissipated the following day over the open waters of the East Pacific.

=== Tropical Storm Greg ===
- Tropical storm (SSHWS)
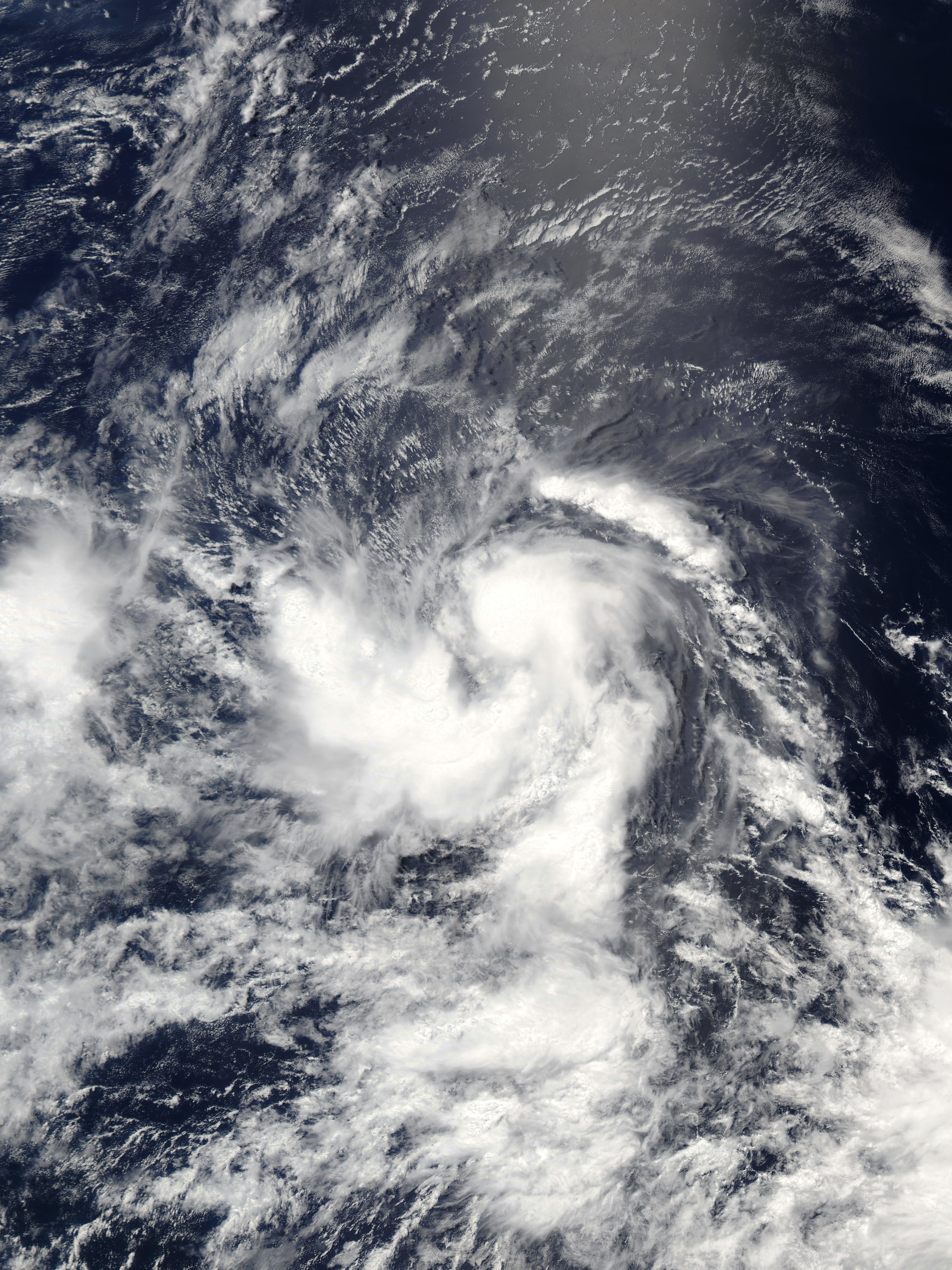
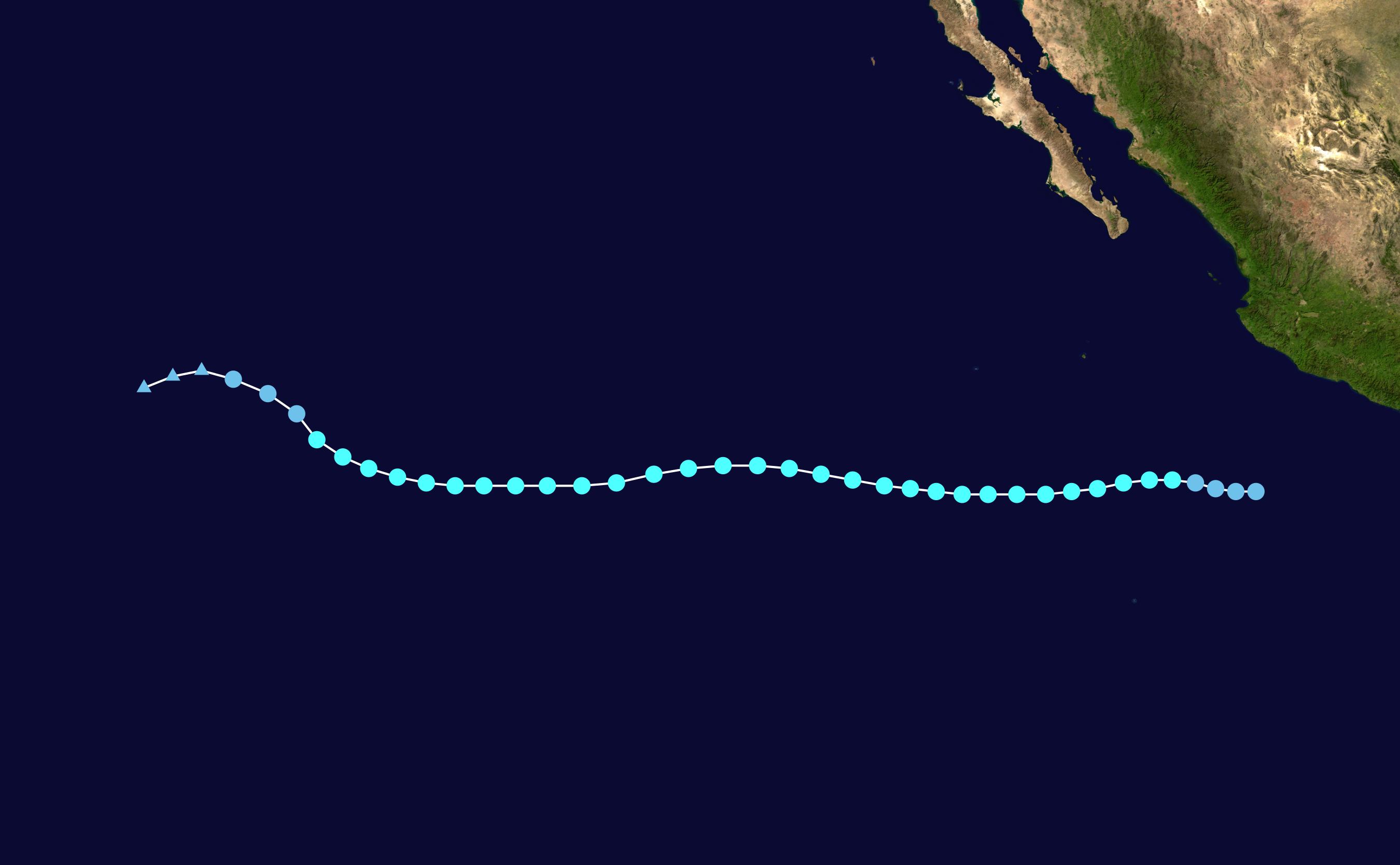
- Duration: July 17 – July 26
- Peak intensity: 60 mph (95 km/h) (1-min); 1000 mbar (hPa)

A tropical wave moved offshore Africa on July 1, contributing to the formation of Tropical Depression Four over the tropical Atlantic three days later. The wave continued west and crossed into the East Pacific on July 13. It began to coalesce thereafter, eventually acquiring enough organization to be considered a tropical depression by 12:00 UTC on July 17 while located about 300 nmi (345 mi; 555 km) south of Manzanillo, Mexico. The newly formed system moved west over open waters without significant intensification due to moderate wind shear and dry air. It intensified into Tropical Storm Greg early on July 18 and attained peak winds of 50 kn (60 mph; 95 km/h) early on July 21, around which time it maintained compact central convection and a mid-level eye feature. Thunderstorm activity fluctuated for a few days before waning more definitively on July 24. Greg weakened to a tropical depression as it crossed into the Central Pacific early on July 26, and it degenerated to a remnant low later that day. The circulation dissipated early on July 27 well to the southeast of the Hawaiian Islands.

=== Hurricane Hilary ===
- Category 2 hurricane (SSHWS)
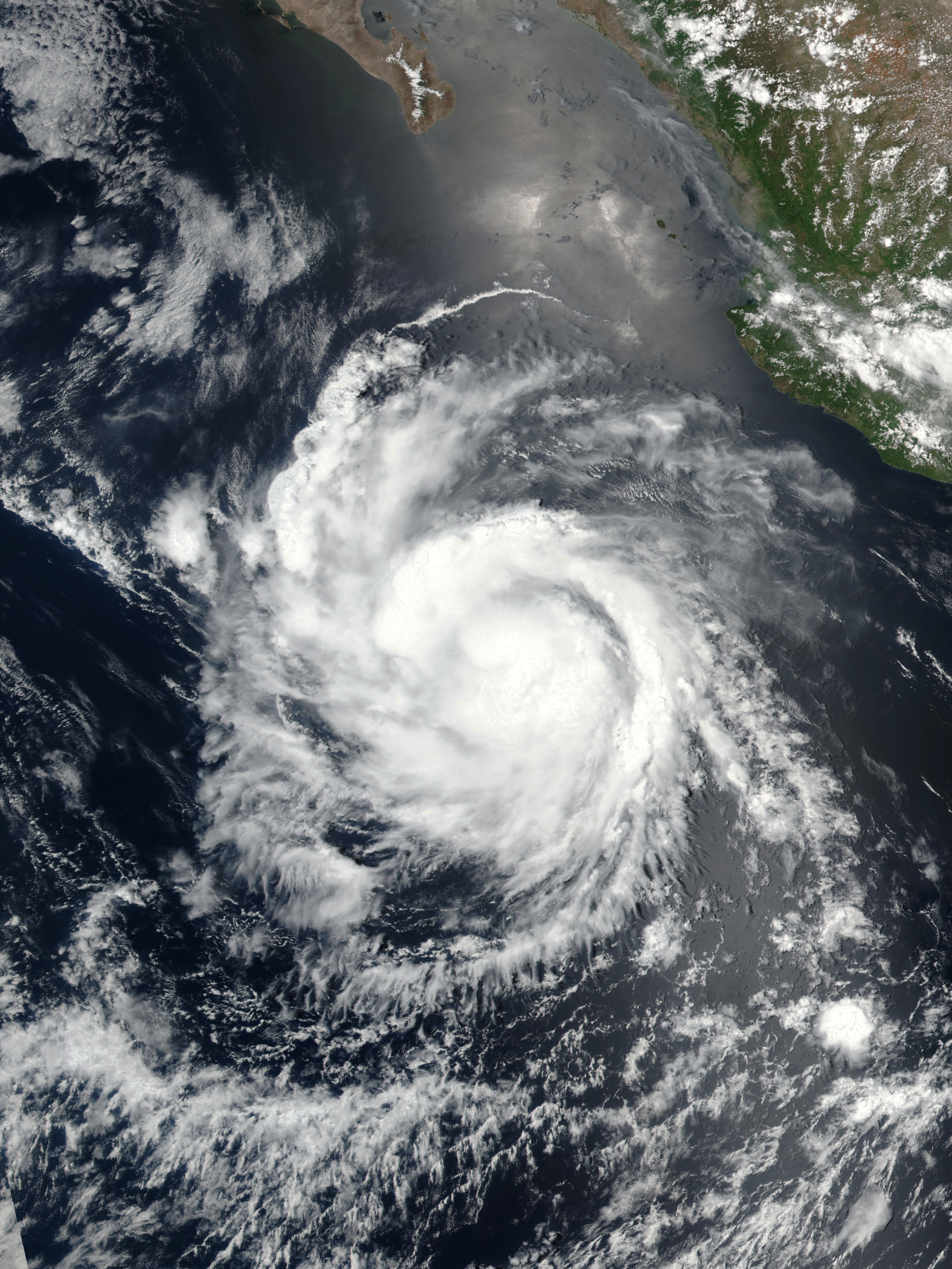
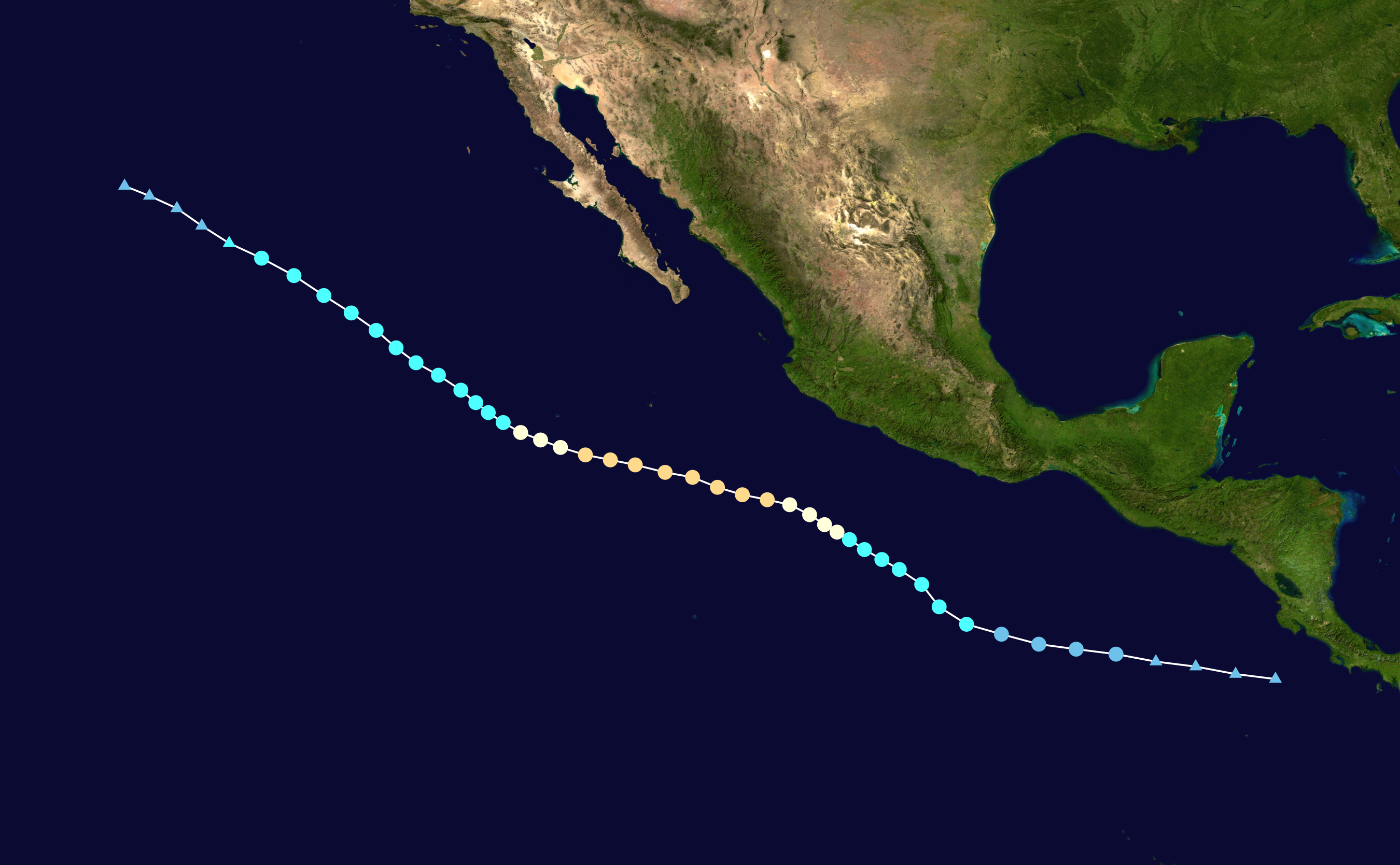
- Duration: July 21 – July 30
- Peak intensity: 110 mph (175 km/h) (1-min); 969 mbar (hPa)

Hilary originated from a tropical wave that emerged off Africa on July 10. The wave moved across the Atlantic without consequence and entered the East Pacific on July 20. Convective activity swiftly improved about a center of circulation, resulting in the development of a tropical depression around 12:00 UTC on July 21 about 450 nmi (520 mi; 835 km) south-southeast of Puerto Ángel, Mexico. The abrupt development was somewhat unexpected due to wind shear that slackened much faster than forecast. In spite of a favorable environment, the system did not intensify over the next day owing to its 90 nmi (105 mi; 165 km) radius of maximum winds. It finally intensified into Tropical Storm Hilary around 12:00 UTC on July 22. From that point, the cyclone first strengthened steadily and then rapidly. It became a hurricane early on July 24 and further attained Category 2 intensity with peak winds of 95 kn (110 mph; 175 km/h) the next day when it displayed a clear, small eye in microwave imagery but maintained a somewhat asymmetric convective pattern overall. The favorable environment soon gave way to increased wind shear and colder waters, causing Hilary to weaken as it moved steadily northwestward across the open East Pacific. The system degenerated to a remnant low around 00:00 UTC on July 31, and that circulation dissipated the next day well to the west of Baja California.

=== Hurricane Irwin ===
- Category 1 hurricane (SSHWS)
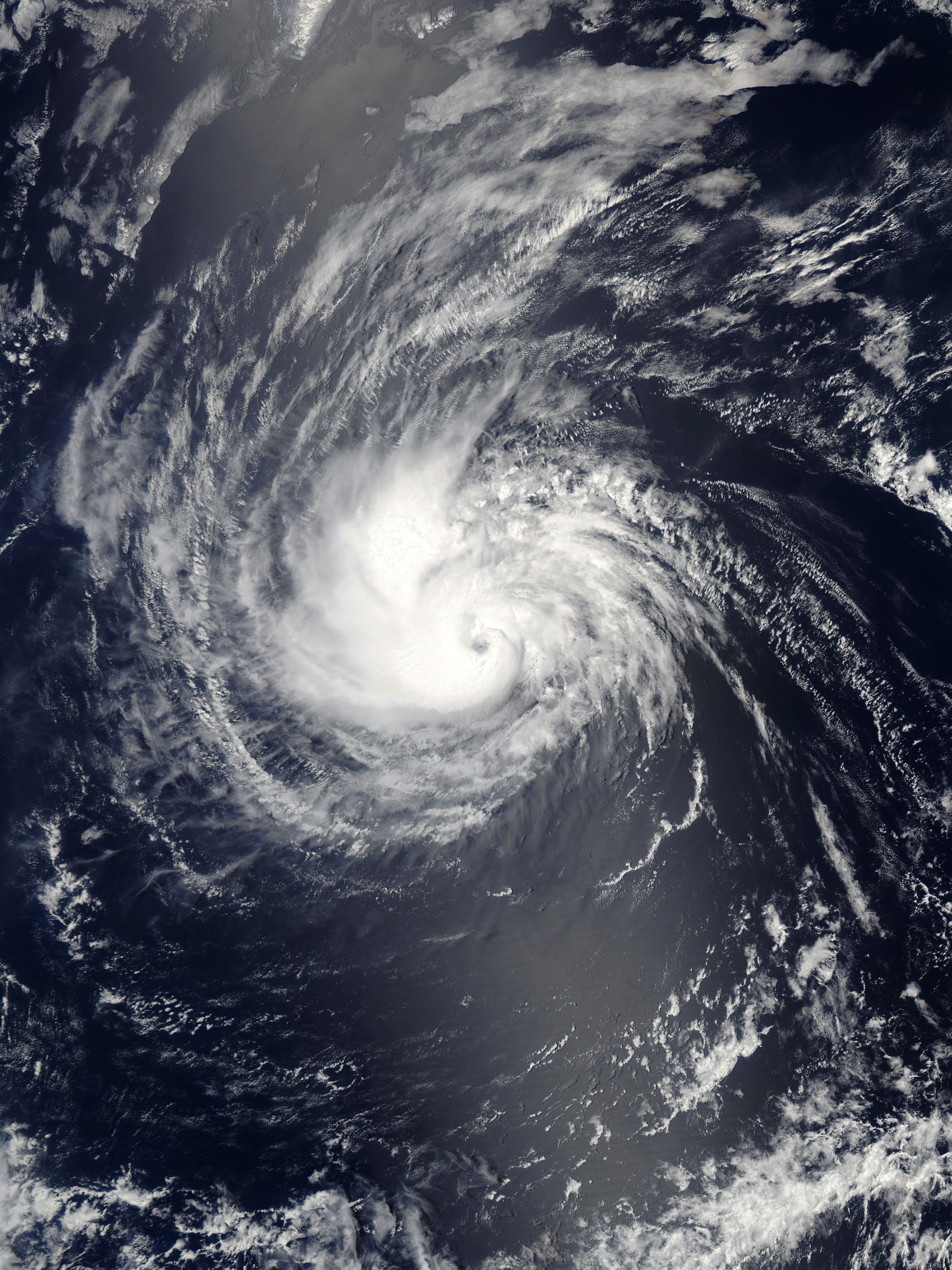
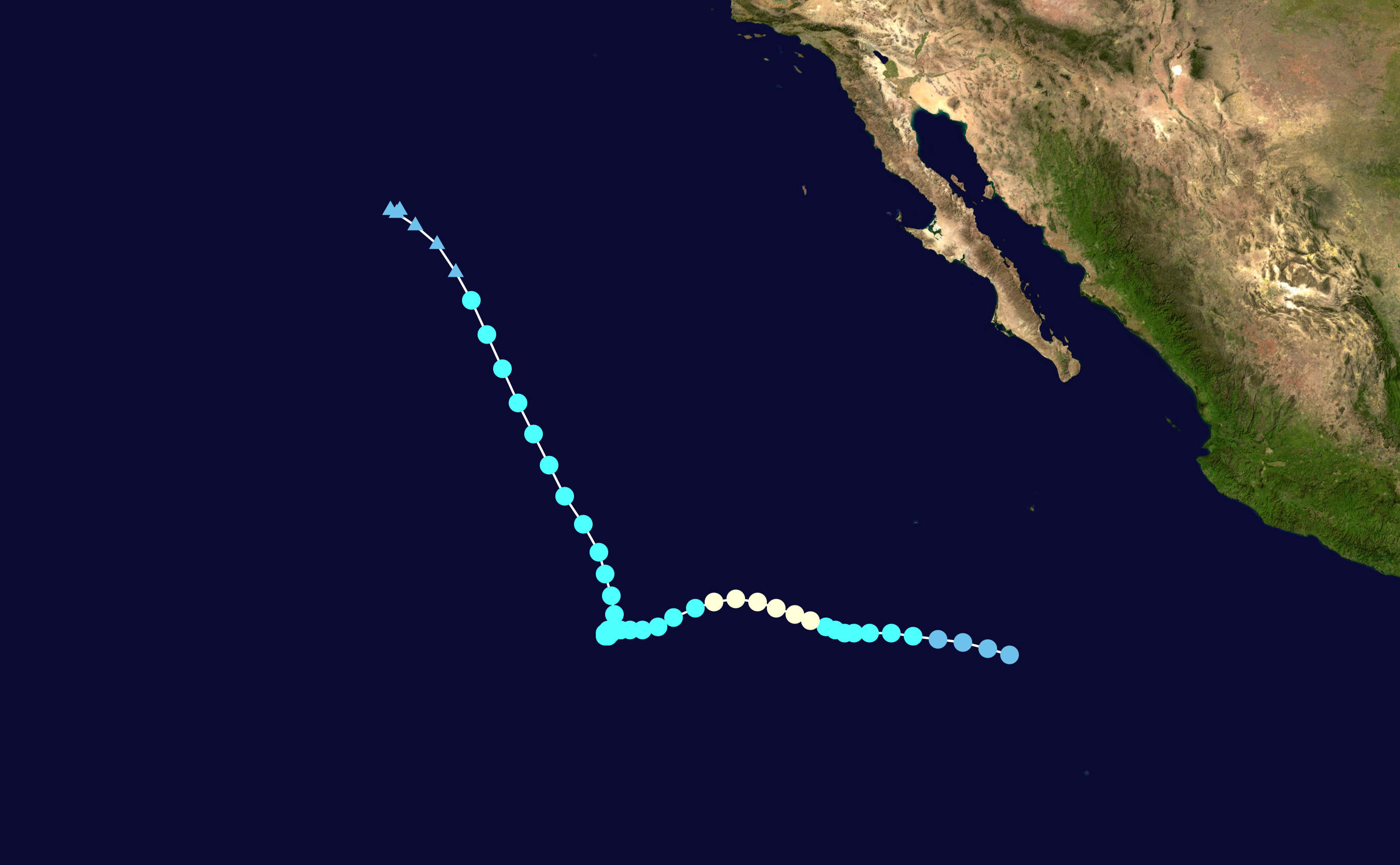
- Duration: July 22 – August 1
- Peak intensity: 90 mph (150 km/h) (1-min); 979 mbar (hPa)

A tropical wave left Africa on July 8 and entered the East Pacific after July 18. A broad area of low pressure gradually gained organization, leading to the formation of a tropical depression around 06:00 UTC on July 22 about 550 nmi (635 mi; 1,020 km) south of the southern tip of the Baja California peninsula. For the first day of the system's life, it was inhibited by moderate wind shear that displaced its thunderstorm activity. However, upper-level winds soon improved, allowing the depression to become Tropical Storm Irwin. It steadily strengthened as it moved westward, becoming a hurricane around 00:00 UTC on July 25 and attaining peak winds of 80 kn (90 mph; 150 km/h) later that day. Although most convection was weighted to the west, it was very cold, approximately −80 °C (−110 °F), and an eye was clearly evident around this time. On July 26, outflow from intensifying Hurricane Hilary to the east began to negatively affect the storm, causing a weakening trend. The influence of the nearby cyclone also caused Irwin to conduct a small loop before prevailing steering currents caused a northward track. This path brought the system into cold waters, and it degenerated to a remnant low around 18:00 UTC on August 1. The circulation dissipated well west of Baja California two days later.

=== Tropical Depression Eleven-E ===
- Tropical depression (SSHWS)
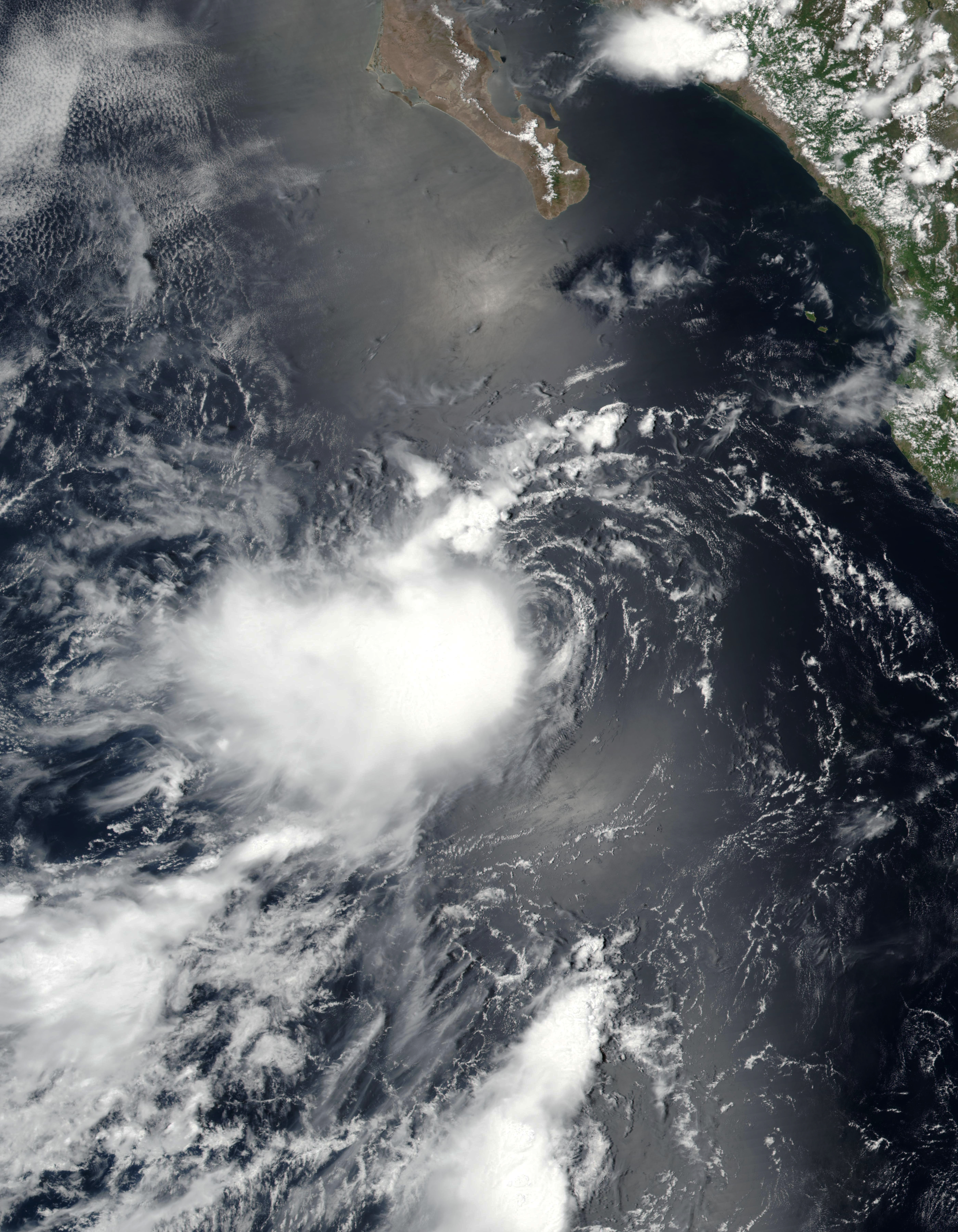
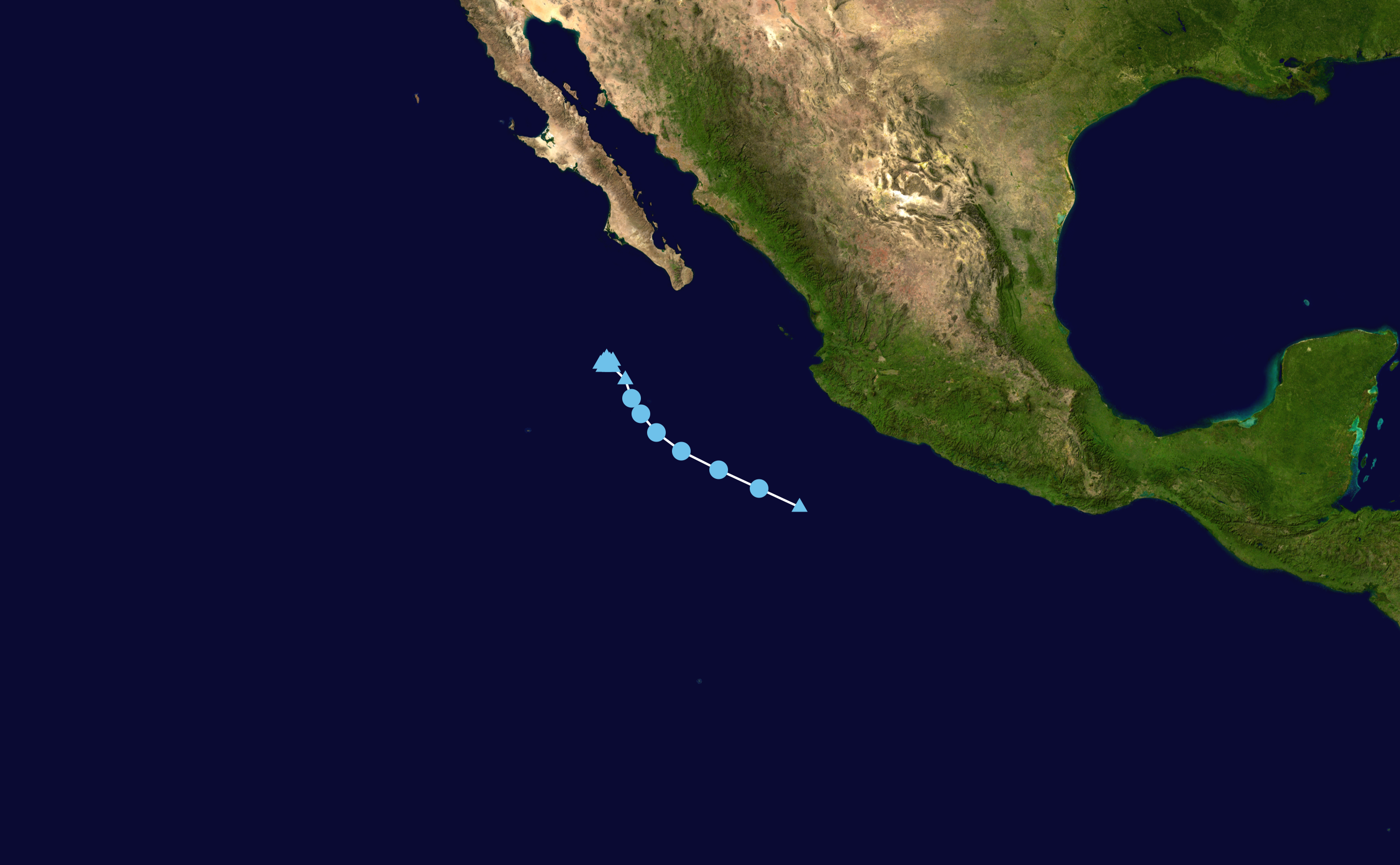
- Duration: August 4 – August 5
- Peak intensity: 35 mph (55 km/h) (1-min); 1006 mbar (hPa)

A tropical wave moved offshore Africa on July 22 and reached the East Pacific on August 1, where it gradually organized to the south of Mexico. A tropical depression formed around 06:00 UTC on August 4 about 225 nmi (260 mi; 415 km) south-southwest of Manzanillo, Mexico. In an environment of strong wind shear, initially considered inhibitive to development, the system's deep thunderstorm activity was relegated to the west of its center, and the cyclone failed to intensify. Instead, it entered a cooler and drier environment and weakened, becoming a remnant low around 18:00 UTC on August 5. The circulation slowed down and conducted a loop to the south of Baja California before dissipating early on August 8.

=== Tropical Storm Jova ===
- Tropical storm (SSHWS)
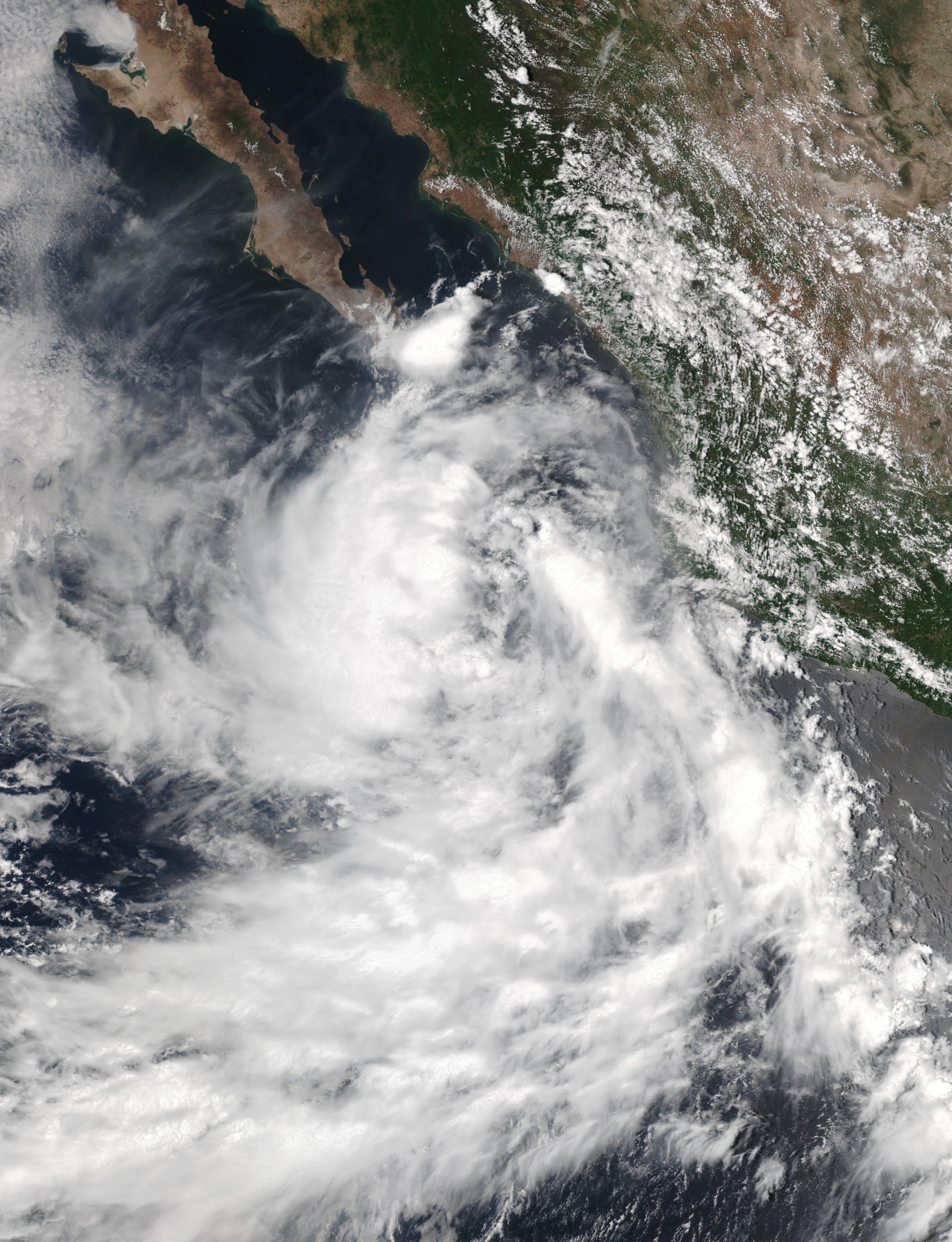
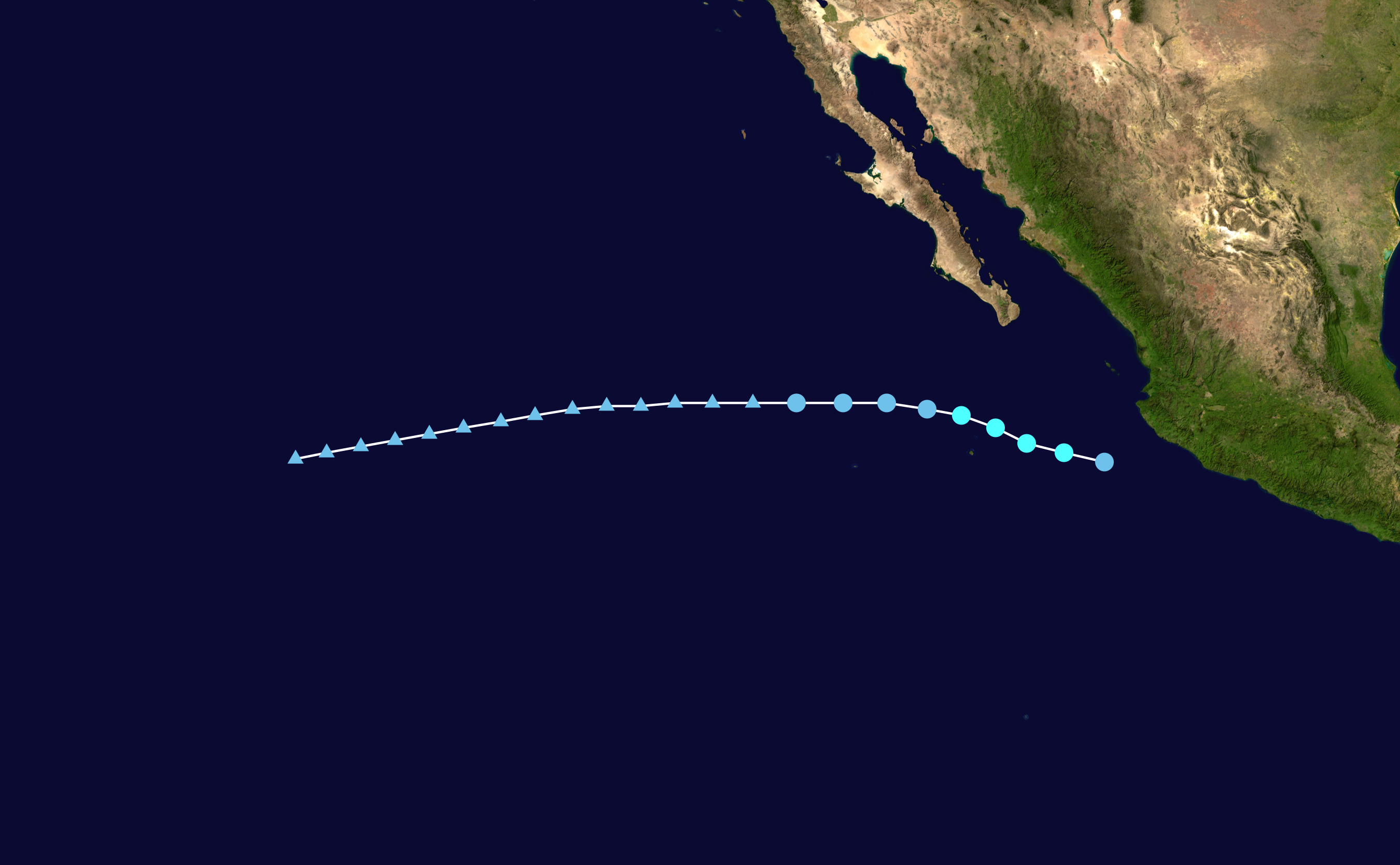
- Duration: August 11 – August 13
- Peak intensity: 40 mph (65 km/h) (1-min); 1003 mbar (hPa)

The NHC began monitoring a strong tropical wave over the eastern Caribbean on August 3. The feature pushed westward, developing into Hurricane Franklin before making landfall on the Yucatán, and attaining its peak as a Category 1 hurricane before making landfall near Vega de Alatorre, Veracruz on August 10. Although its low-level circulation dissipated, the NHC in days prior noted the potential for Franklin's mid-level remnants to reform in the East Pacific. The remnants of Franklin induced a surface low off the coast of southwestern Mexico on August 11, and steady organization led to the formation of Tropical Storm Jova by 03:00 UTC the next day. On a westward course, Jova was plagued by strong wind shear from an area of high pressure over northwestern Mexico, with a very disorganized appearance on satellite. After lacking sufficient organization to be declared a tropical cyclone, the storm was declared a remnant low around 03:00 UTC on August 14.

=== Hurricane Kenneth ===
- Category 4 hurricane (SSHWS)
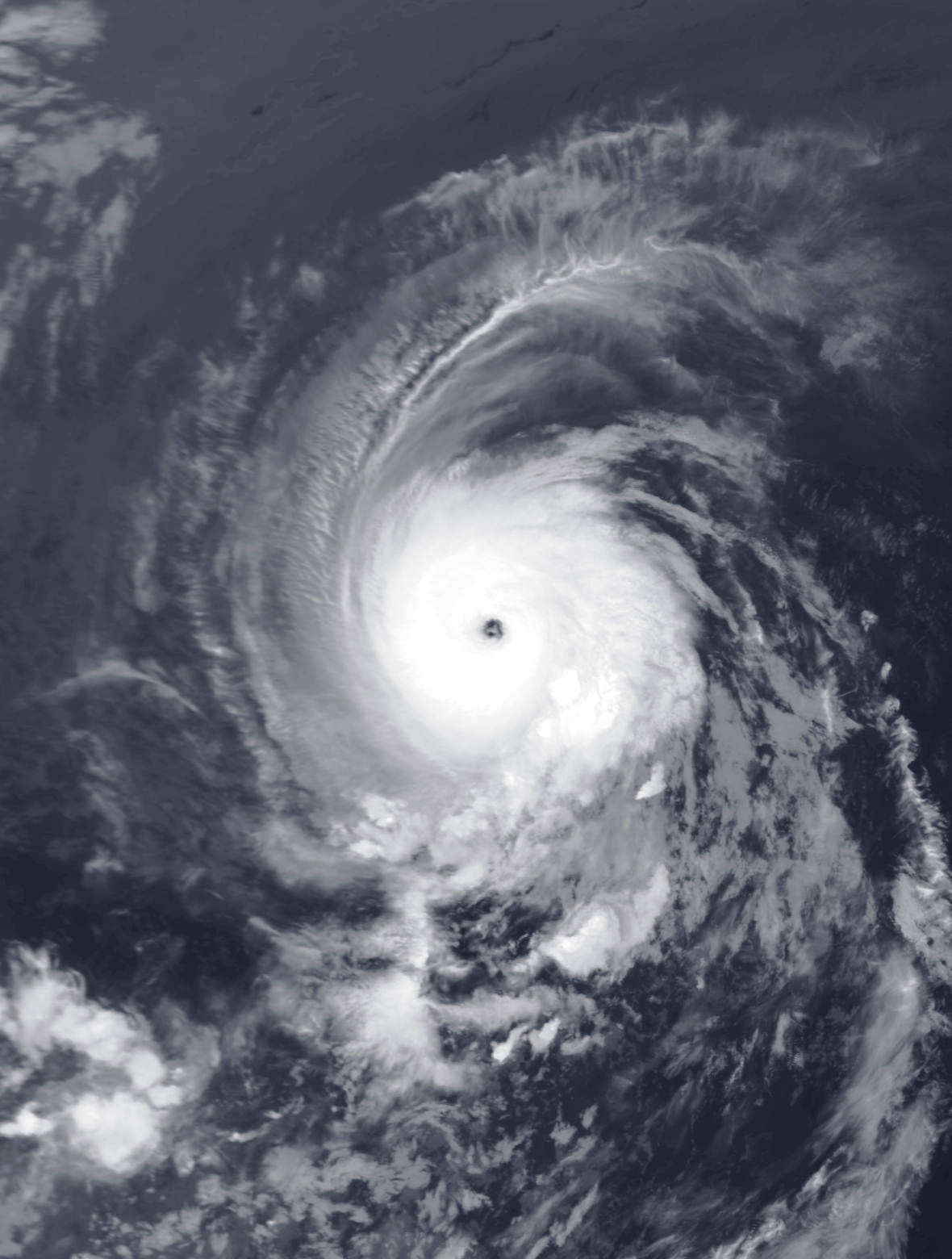
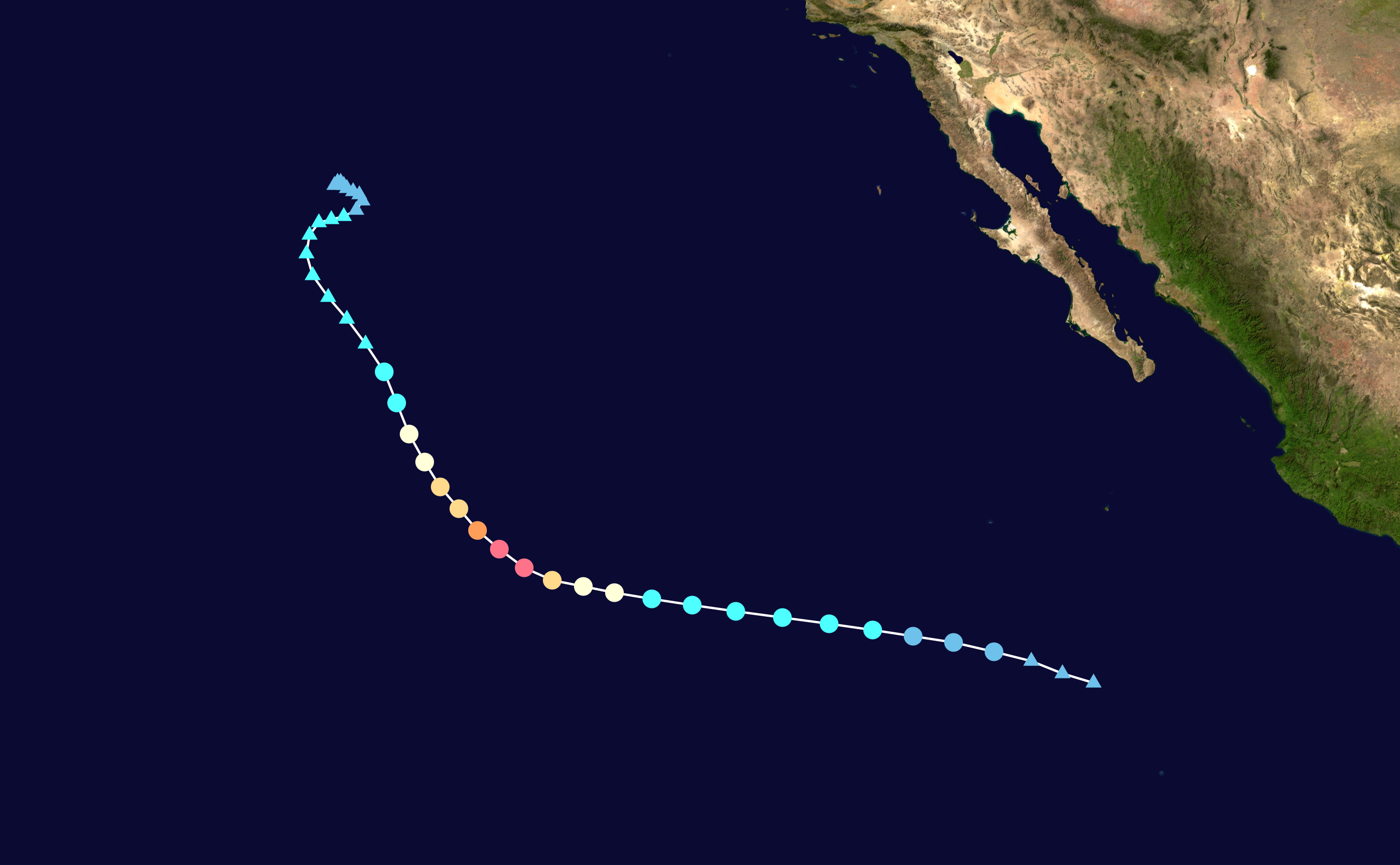
- Duration: August 18 – August 23
- Peak intensity: 130 mph (215 km/h) (1-min); 951 mbar (hPa)

On August 12, the NHC noted the potential for an area of low pressure to form well south of Baja California Peninsula during the following days. A large area of disturbed weather developed two days later as predicted; however, organization was slow to occur, and a tropical depression only formed four days later, around 15:00 UTC on August 18. The newly formed cyclone embarked on a west to west-northwest course, intensifying into Tropical Storm Kenneth early on August 19 and further into a hurricane by 15:00 UTC on August 20. Despite forecasts of only slight additional intensification, Kenneth's small size allowed it to begin to rapidly intensified, with its eye warming dramatically and the surrounding cloud tops cooling quickly. The cyclone attained major hurricane strength around 03:00 UTC on August 21, and six hours later reached its peak as a Category 4 hurricane with sustained winds of 130 mph (210 km/h). Progressively cooler sea surface temperatures and increasing wind shear caused Kenneth to steadily weaken following the intensification trend, with its inner core eroding and low-level circulation becoming displaced. By 21:00 UTC on August 22, the storm weakened below hurricane strength. On the following day, at 21:00 UTC, Kenneth was declared to be post-tropical. The remnant low meandered due to weak steering currents, before finally dissipating on August 27.

=== Tropical Storm Lidia ===
- Tropical storm (SSHWS)
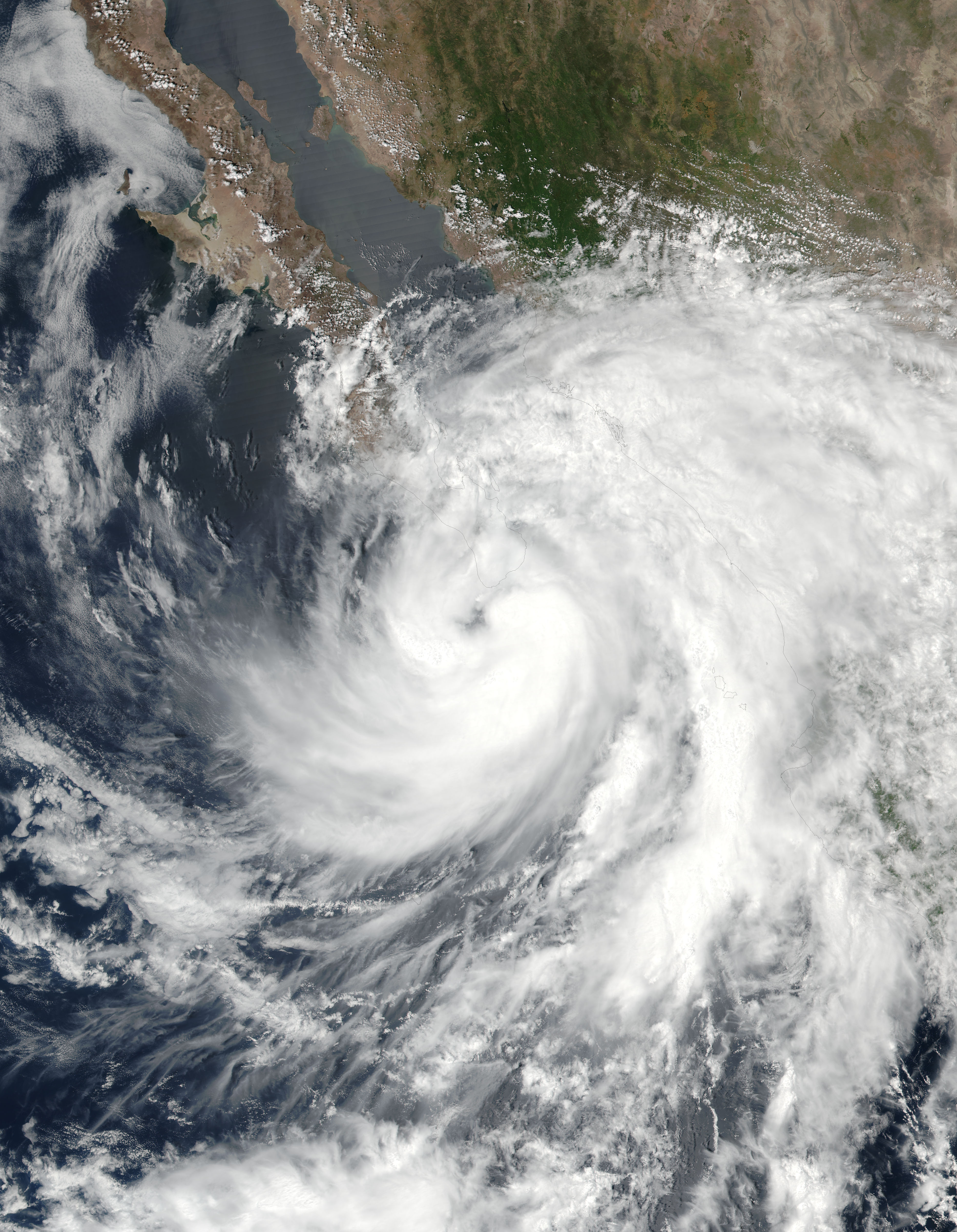
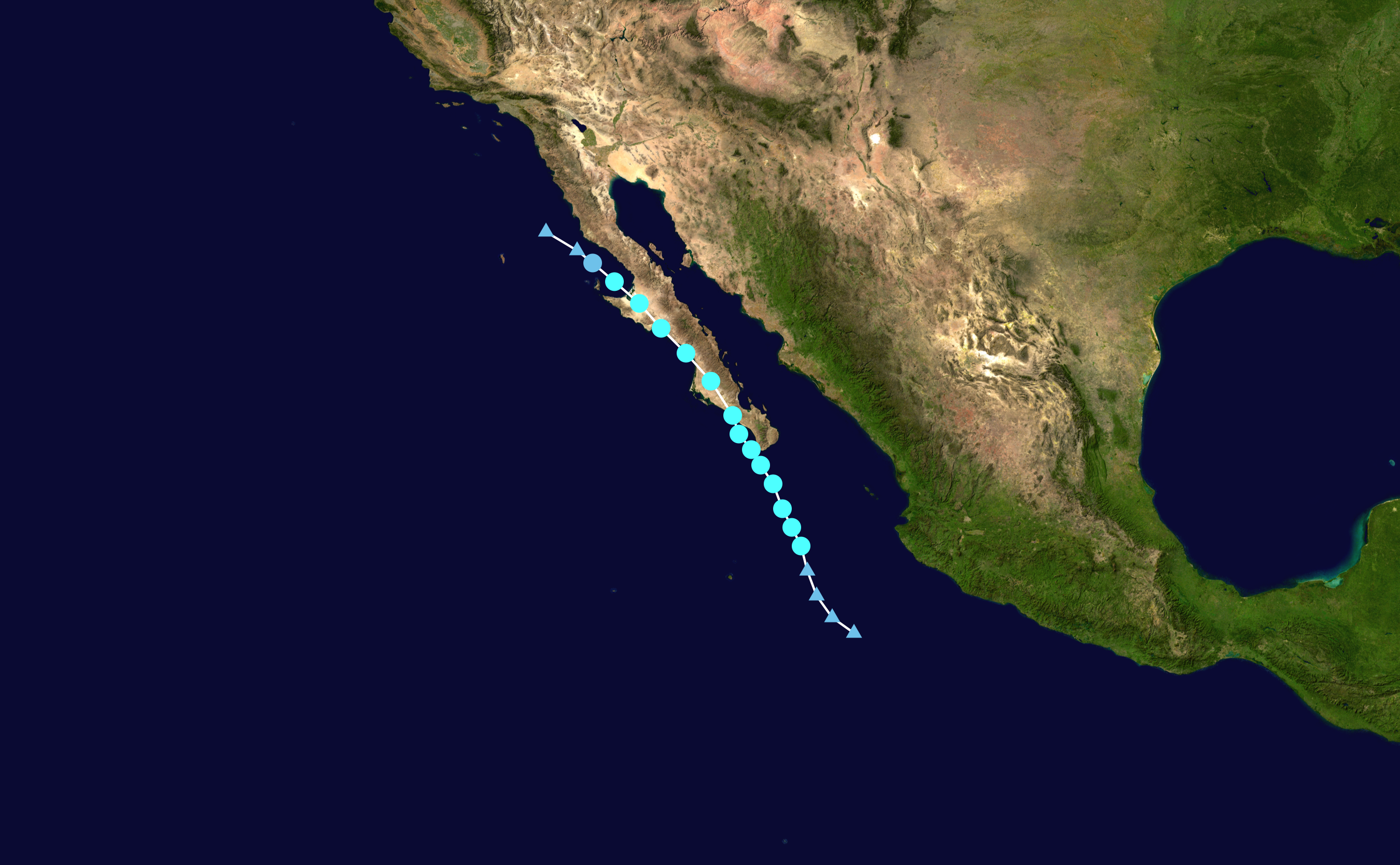
- Duration: August 30 – September 3
- Peak intensity: 65 mph (100 km/h) (1-min); 986 mbar (hPa)

A vigorous tropical wave emerged off the western coast of Africa on August 16; it crossed Central America into the East Pacific on August 25. Part of a large cyclonic gyre, the disturbance failed to organize for several days—despite already producing tropical storm-force winds—amid high wind shear from Hurricane Harvey in the Gulf of Mexico. After Harvey weakened, however, an increase in the system's organization led to the formation of Tropical Storm Lidia around 18:00 UTC on August 30. Flow between a subtropical high and upper-level trough directed Lidia on a north-northwest track, and the cyclone strengthened to a peak of 65 mph (105 km/h) later on August 31. Lidia passed very close to Cabo San Lucas early the next morning, and interaction with the high terrain of Baja California Sur caused the storm to weaken slightly; it made its first landfall near Punta Marquez with winds of 60 mph (95 km/h) around 12:00 UTC, and its second landfall near Punta Abreojos early on September 2 with winds of 45 mph (70 km/h). Lidia continued to weaken as it moved northwest, degenerating to a remnant low around 06:00 UTC on September 3 and dissipating twelve hours later.

=== Hurricane Otis ===
- Category 3 hurricane (SSHWS)
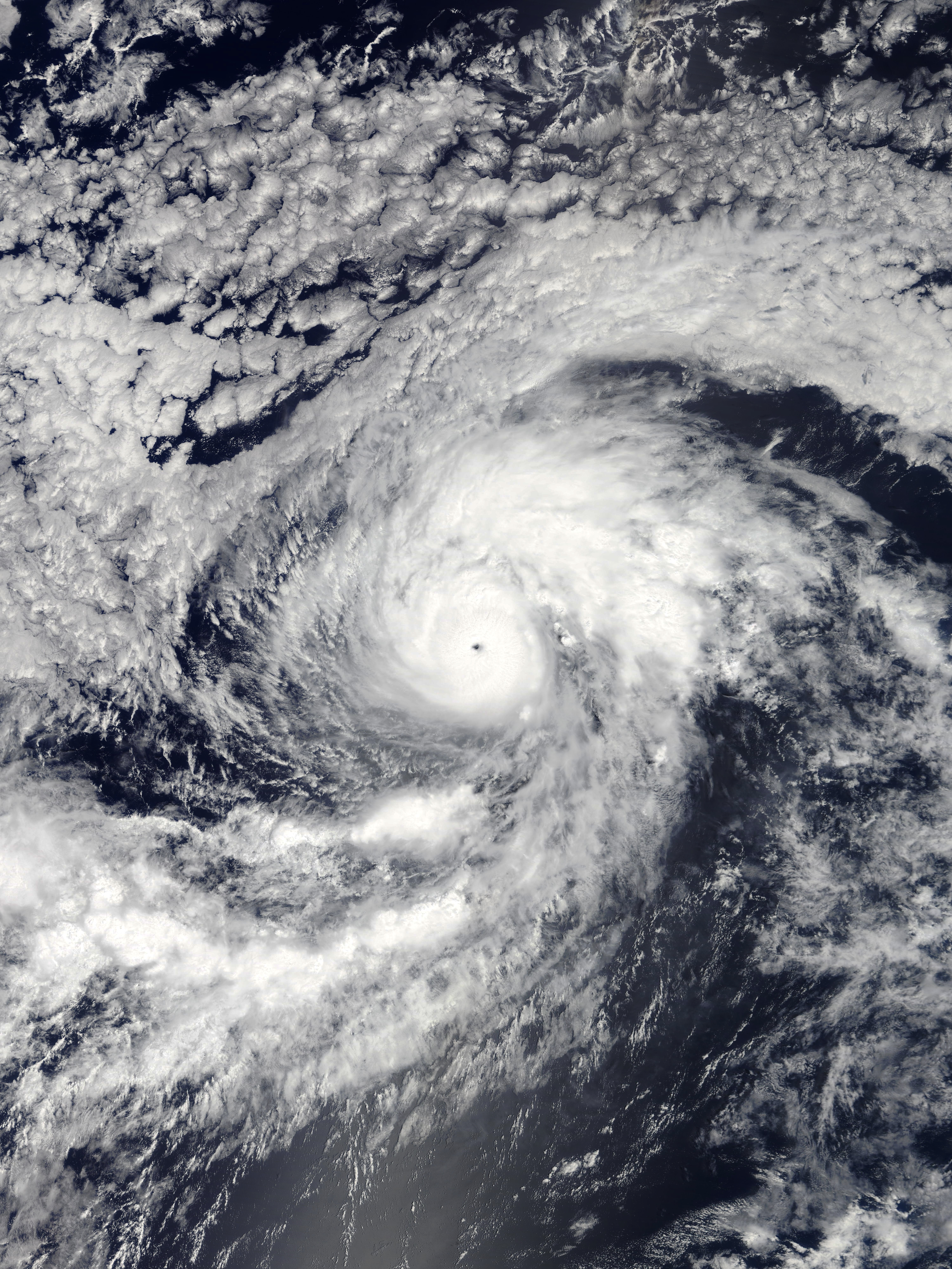
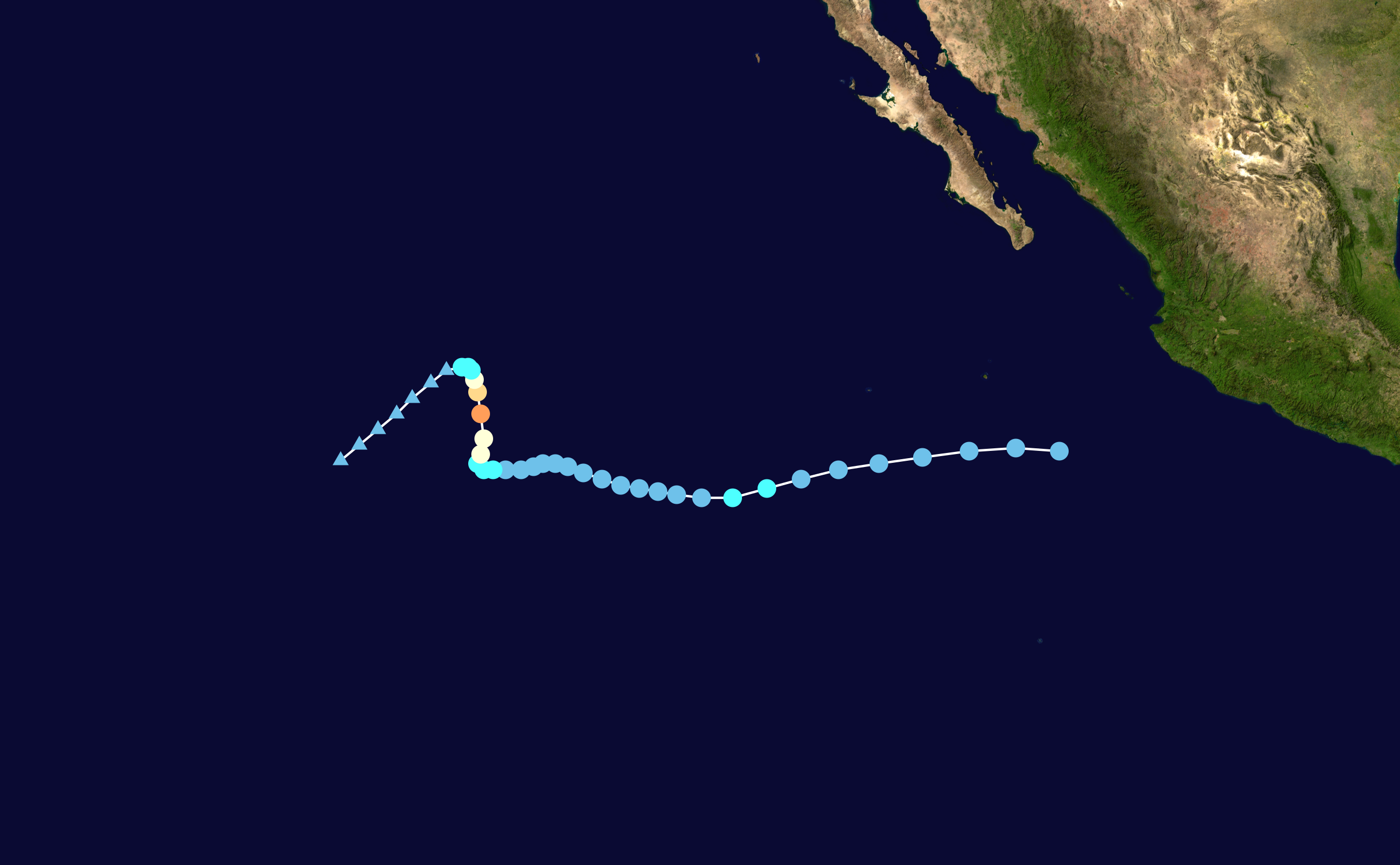
- Duration: September 11 – September 19
- Peak intensity: 115 mph (185 km/h) (1-min); 965 mbar (hPa)

On September 8, Atlantic Hurricane Katia made landfall in Mexico, dissipating on September 9. However, its mid-level circulation survived, and eventually spawned an area of low pressure off the coast of Mexico. On September 11, the system organized into Tropical Depression Fifteen-E. It strengthened into a tropical storm at 00:00 UTC on September 13 and reached its initial peak intensity of 40 mph with its pressure falling to 1003 mb. However, the upgrade was not made operationally and the system weakened back to a tropical depression 12 hours later without being named. During the next several days the depression slowly drifted westward and struggled to intensify as it was situated within a dry environment. Some models even predicted the depression would dissipate without ever reaching tropical storm strength again. However, by 15:00 UTC on September 16, the system unexpectedly started to organize with a small area of deep convection developing near its low-level center, which allowed it to finally restrengthen into a tropical storm later that day, at which time it was given the name Otis. Only marginal strengthening was forecast, but Otis unexpectedly rapidly intensified into a Category 2 hurricane by 15:00 UTC on September 17, despite low ocean temperatures, dry air, and increased wind shear. Otis continued to intensify into a Category 3 major hurricane by 03:00 UTC on September 18, developing a well-defined eye with a diameter of 12 mi (19 km). Twelve hours after developing a well-defined eye, however, Otis started weakening as quickly as it had intensified, and by 21:00 UTC on September 19, Otis had weakened back into a tropical storm with maximum sustained winds of only 45 mph (70 km/h). After losing most of its deep convection due to low sea surface temperatures, Otis degenerated to a remnant low.

=== Hurricane Max ===
- Category 1 hurricane (SSHWS)
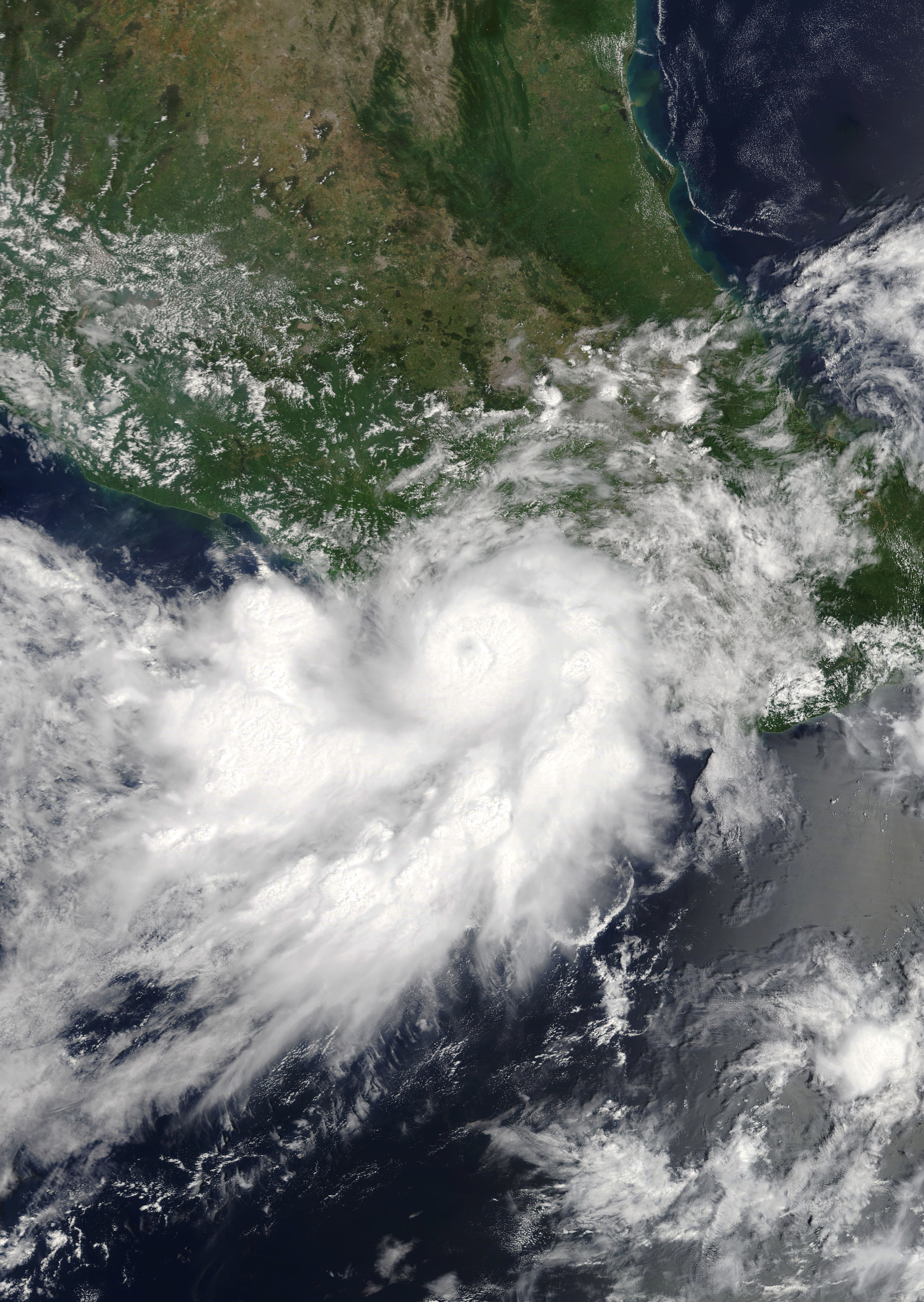
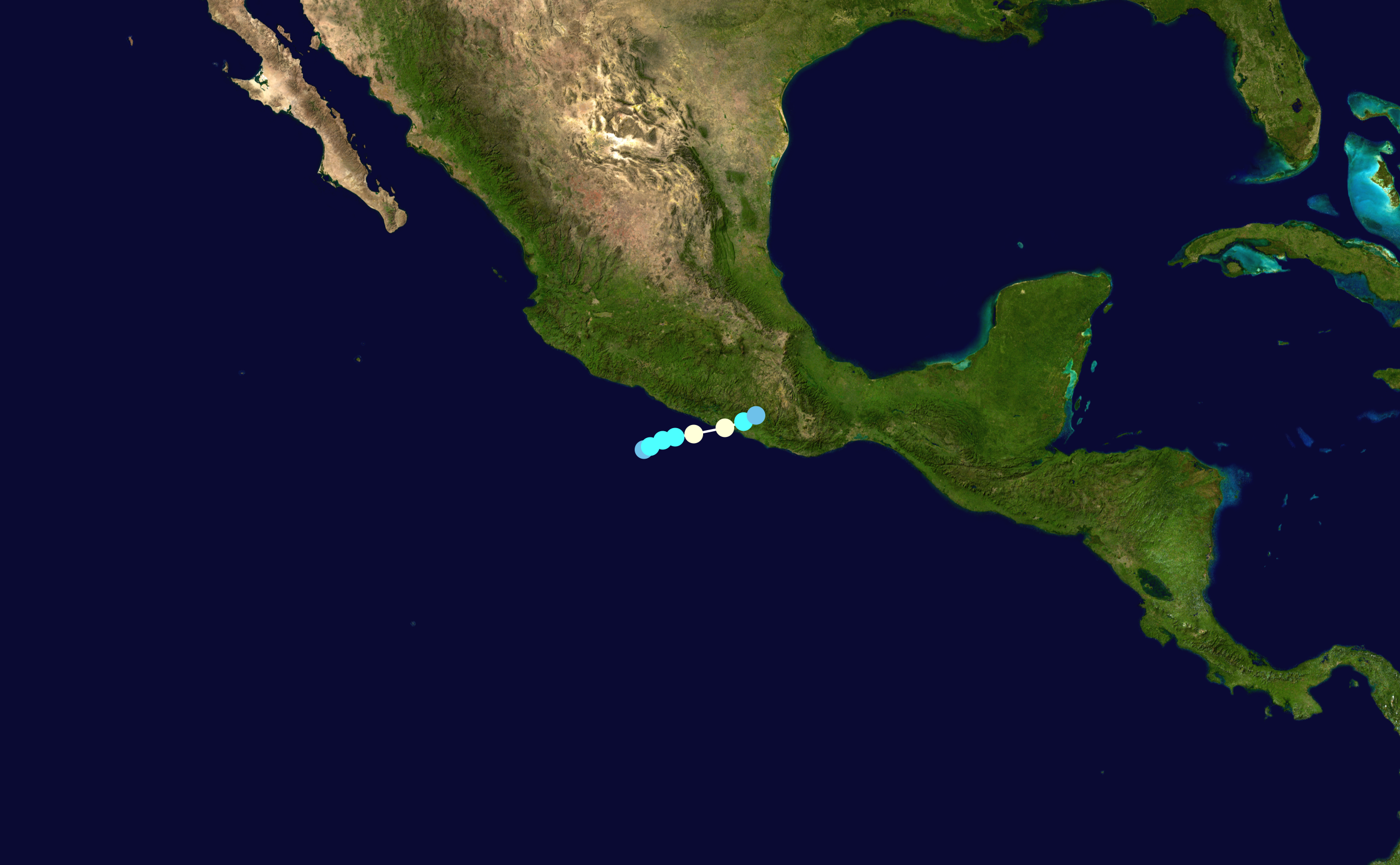
- Duration: September 13 – September 15
- Peak intensity: 90 mph (150 km/h) (1-min); 980 mbar (hPa)

On September 9, the NHC mentioned the possibility for an area of low pressure to form south of Mexico over later days. A trough of low pressure materialized the next day, steadily organizing into a tropical depression near the southwestern coast of Mexico around 15:00 UTC on September 13. Despite forecasts of little or no intensification, the newly formed cyclone intensified into Tropical Storm Max six hours later. Quick intensification ensued as the storm improved in structure and developed a well-defined eye, prompting the NHC to upgrade Max to a hurricane around 12:00 UTC on September 14. Max attained peak winds of 90 mph (145 km/h), while making landfall on the coastline of Guerrero. The mountainous terrain of inland Mexico severely disrupted Max's circulation, causing it to degenerate into a remnant low by 09:00 UTC on September 15, dissipating over Mexico later that day.

In preparation for Max, about 788 people evacuated to temporary shelters. Throughout Guerrero, over 1,500 homes were inundated by floodwaters or damaged by strong winds that ripped off roofs. Over 100 trees were downed, mudslides and sinkholes closed several roads (including Mexican Federal Highway 200), and telephone service was cut. At the height of the storm, 126,503 Comisión Federal de Electricidad customers lost electricity. A bridge between Cruz Grande and Copala was severely damaged, and access to Juchitán de Zaragoza was severed due to a flooded highway. One of 17 rapidly-rising rivers swept away a residence and two neighbors who attempted to rescue the homeowner; one of the neighbors died, constituting one of two deaths attributed to the storm. At least 3,000 residents across five municipalities in Guerrero were stranded. Waves of 10–16 ft (3.0–4.9 m) battered the coastline, where six ships were sunk. Damage from the hurricane was estimated to be around US$13 million.

=== Hurricane Norma ===
- Category 1 hurricane (SSHWS)
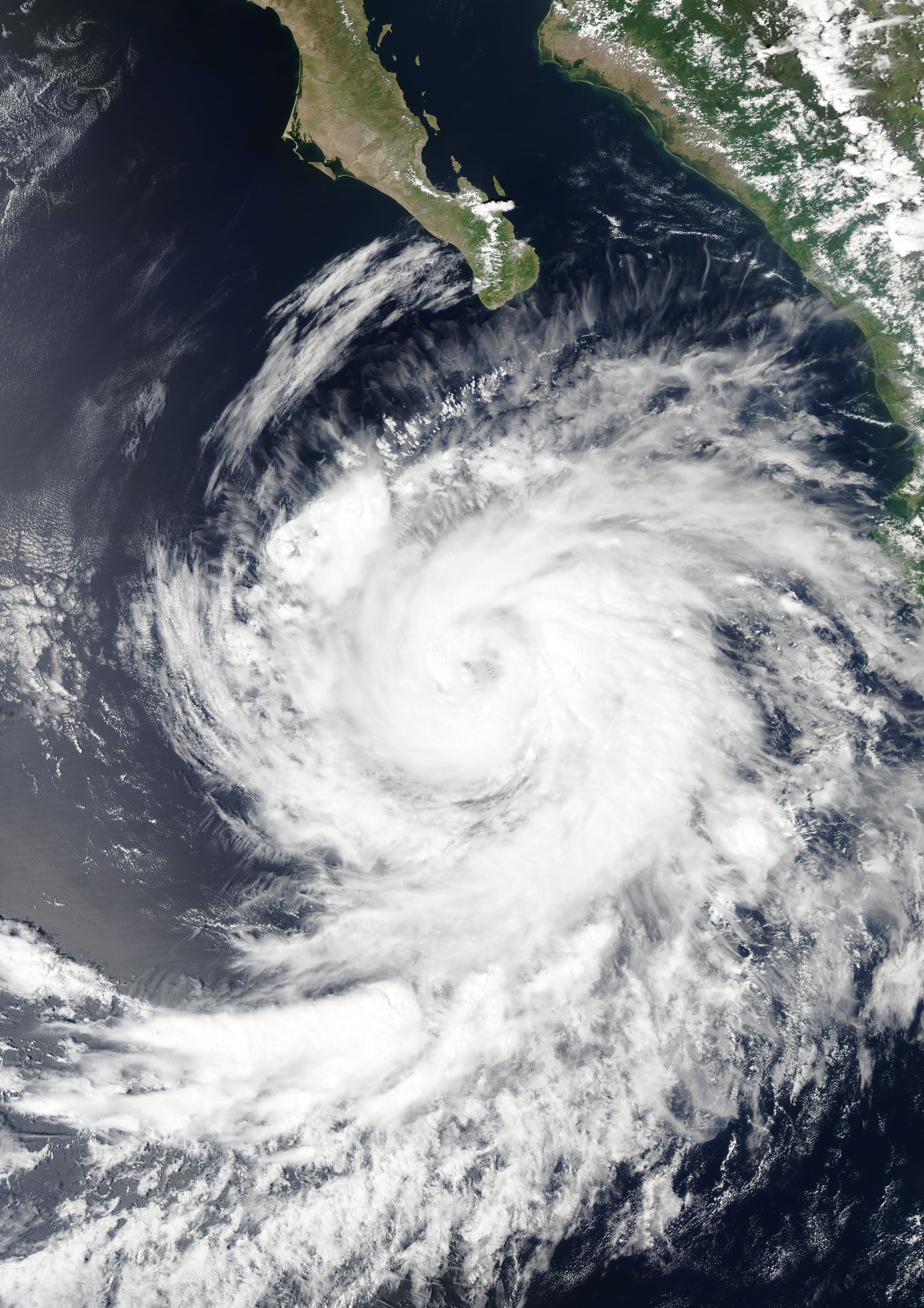
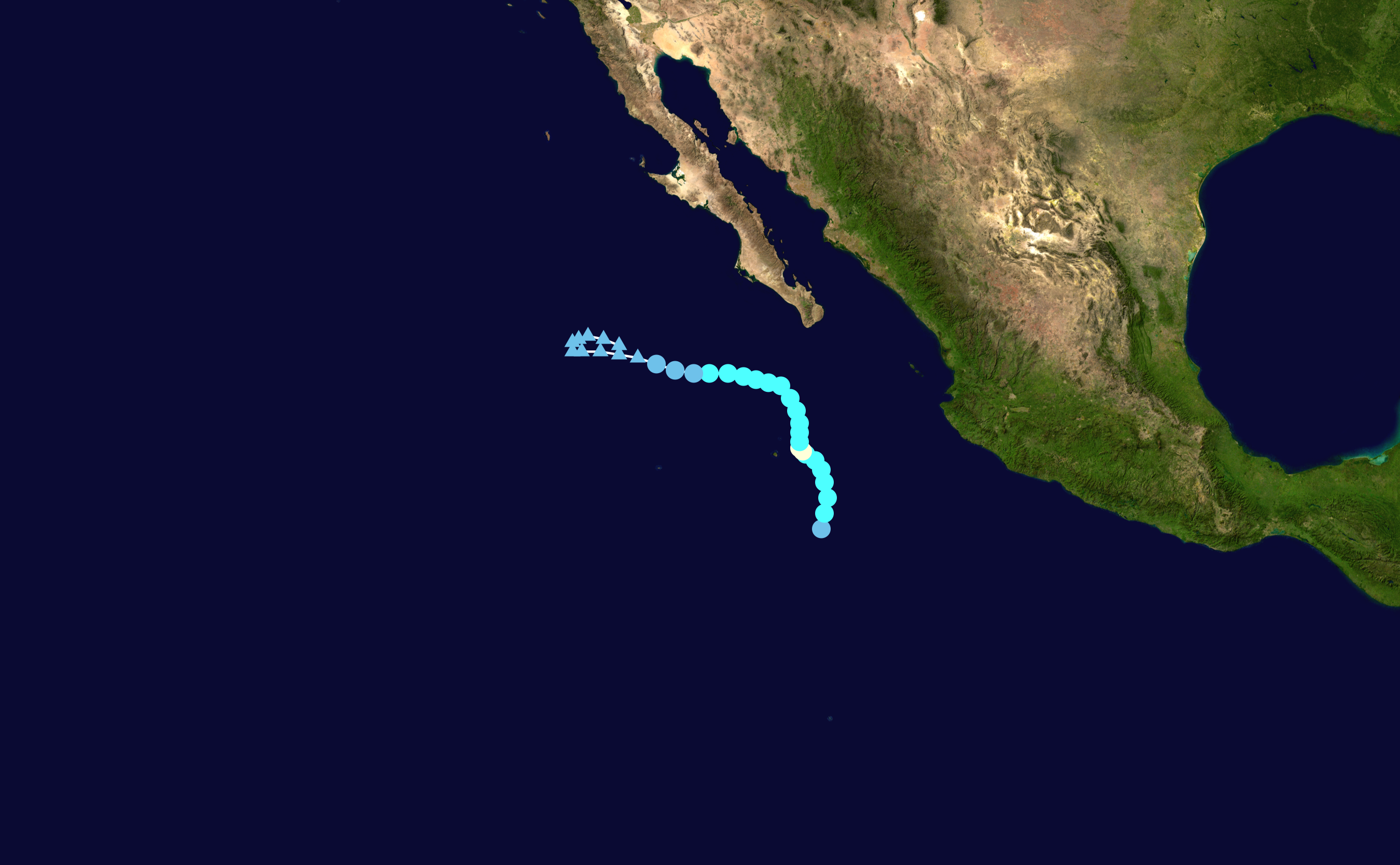
- Duration: September 14 – September 20
- Peak intensity: 75 mph (120 km/h) (1-min); 985 mbar (hPa)

On September 10, the NHC started to monitor an area of low pressure — associated with the tropical wave that spawned Hurricane Irma in the Atlantic basin — well south of Manzanillo, Mexico. The disturbance gradually organized during the following days and by 09:00 UTC on September 14 the system was noted to develop a well-defined center and spiral banding. This led to the formation of Tropical Storm Norma, operationally skipping tropical depression status. In post-season analysis, it was determined that Norma had formed as a tropical depression three hours earlier, and that it did not strengthen into a tropical storm until 12:00 UTC. The newly formed tropical storm continued to intensify at a steady pace while it moved slowly northward, becoming a Category 1 hurricane by 00:00 UTC on September 16 and reaching winds of 75 mph (120 km/h). At this time warnings were being issued for the southern portions of the Baja California Peninsula as Norma was forecast to become a significant hurricane and make landfall in the area. However, its broad circulation and the entrainment of dry air quickly became an impediment in doing so. Norma then weakened back to a tropical storm at 12:00 UTC later that day while becoming stationary, though a developing ridge over Mexico began to move the storm slowly towards the north. Norma maintained its intensity the next day and continued being slowly steered by the ridge towards a northwesterly to west-northwesterly path, all tropical storm warnings were discontinued as Norma started to shift its track more to the west. The cyclone continued weakening for several days as it slowly drifted to the west, until finally degenerating into a remnant low at 03:00 UTC on September 20. The remnants of Norma persisted for a little over 2 days before they completely dissipated.

=== Tropical Storm Pilar ===
- Tropical storm (SSHWS)
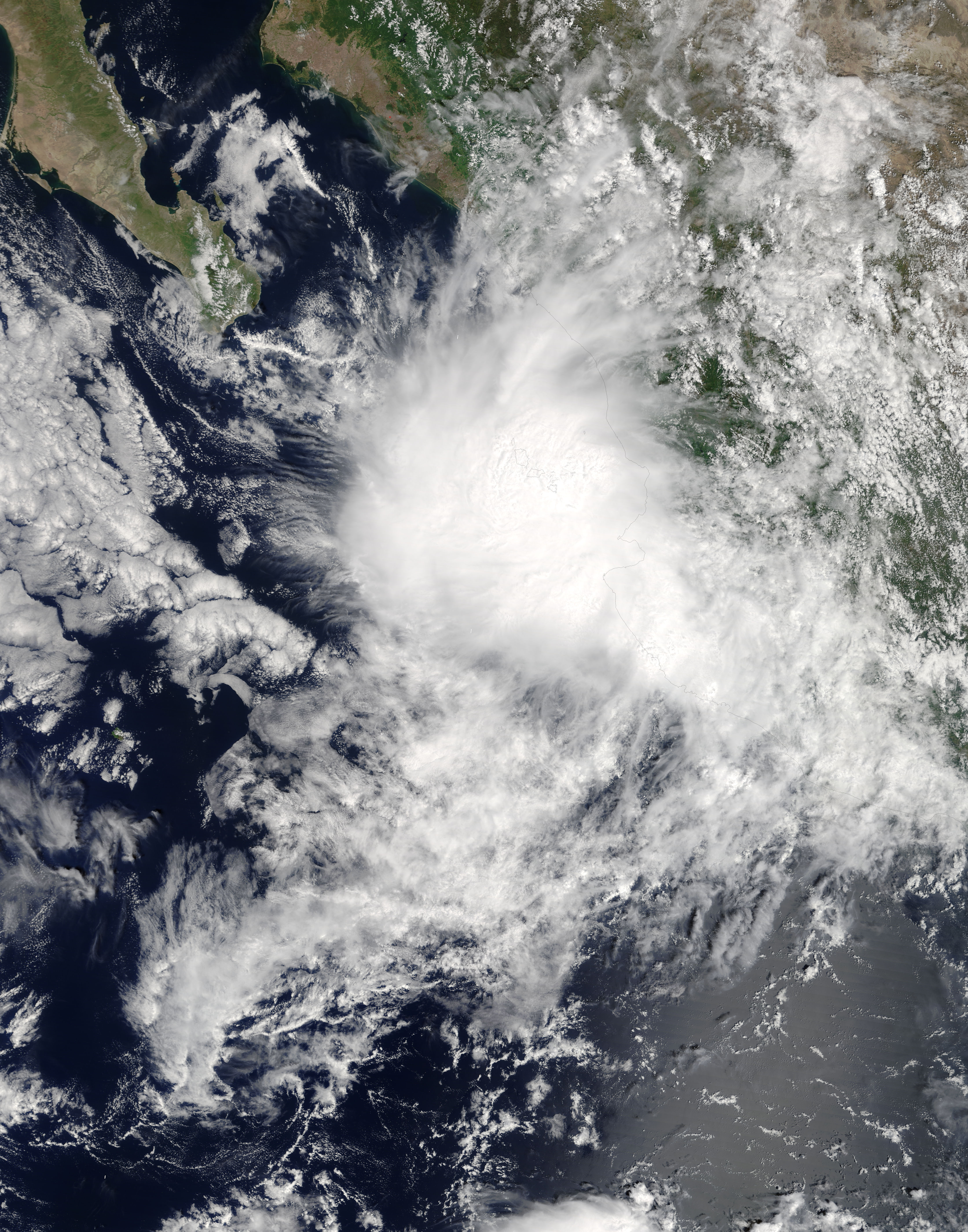
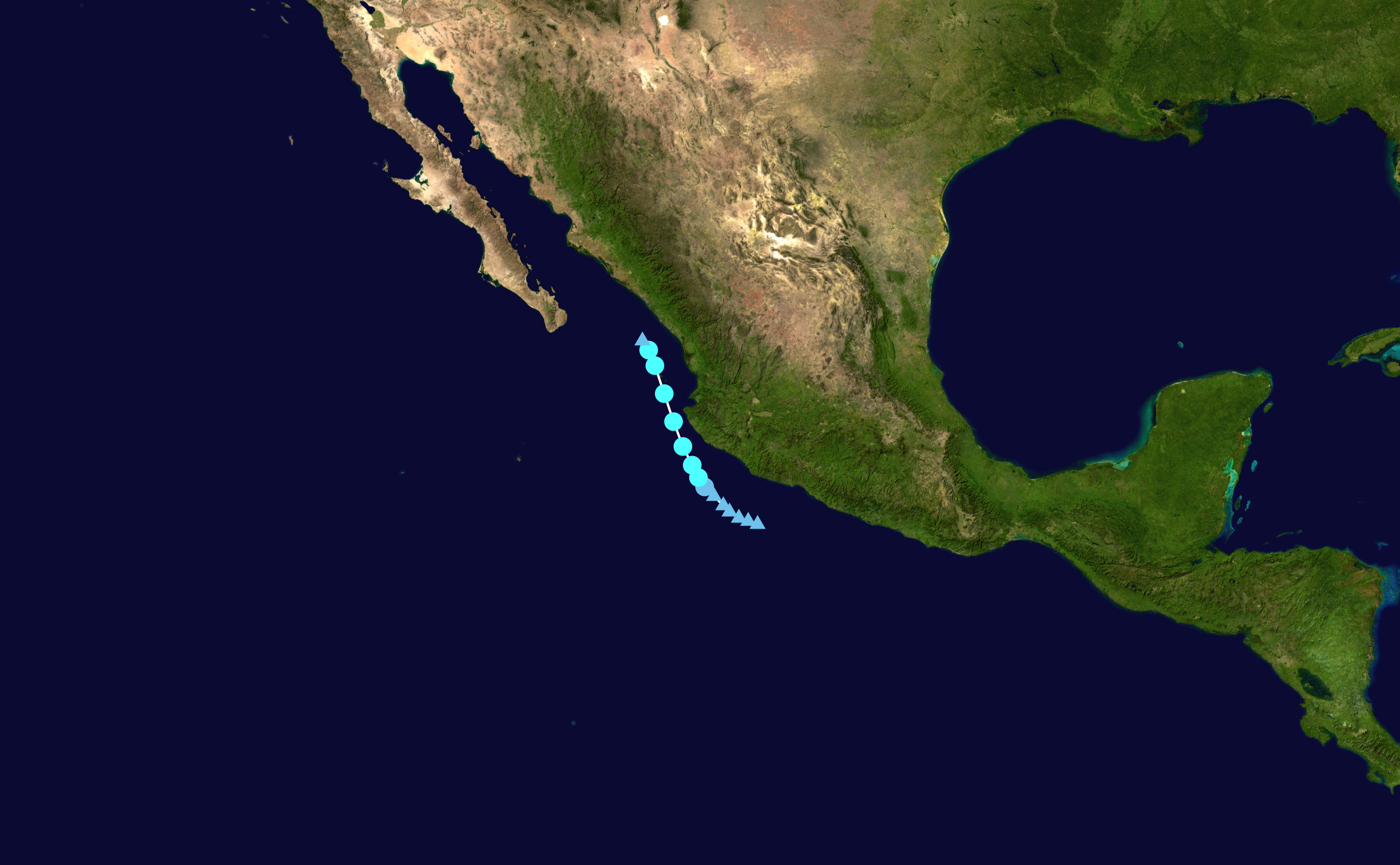
- Duration: September 23 – September 25
- Peak intensity: 50 mph (85 km/h) (1-min); 1000 mbar (hPa)

During the week of September 18, the NHC began monitoring a tropical wave, as it spawned a broad area of low pressure located offshore of the southwestern coast of Mexico. The disturbance lacked any significant organization until September 23 at around 21:00 UTC when the system was noted to developed surface winds of over 35 mph (55 km/h) becoming Tropical Depression Eighteen-E. The depression organized into a tropical storm six hours later and was given the name Pilar, the sixteenth named storm of the annual Pacific hurricane season. Thereafter, despite having a disorganized appearance on satellite, Pilar's winds increased in strength, and it reached its peak with sustained winds of 50 mph (80 km/h). By 09:00 UTC on September 24, Pilar continued to track north along the coast, with warnings being issued for the southwestern coast of Mexico. However, early on September 25, these warnings were discontinued, as Tropical Storm Pilar showed signs of weakening mainly due to land interaction, and was reduced to a tropical depression before ultimately dissipating at around 21:00 UTC later that same day. Although Pilar did not make landfall as a tropical cyclone, heavy rainfall was reported in Puerto Vallarta, Mexico, to the northeast of Islas Marías, and in other areas along the Mexican coastline.

=== Tropical Storm Ramon ===
- Tropical storm (SSHWS)
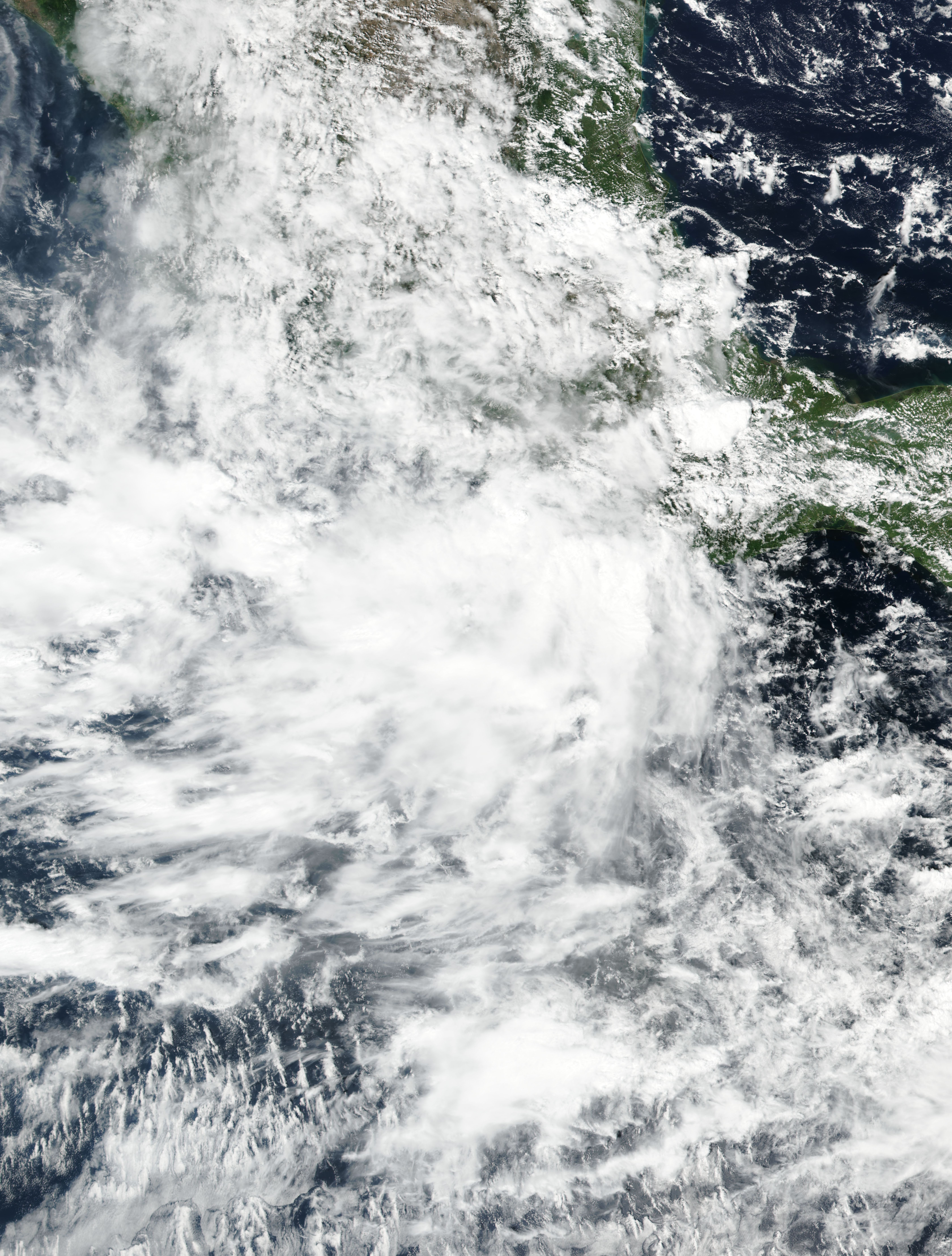
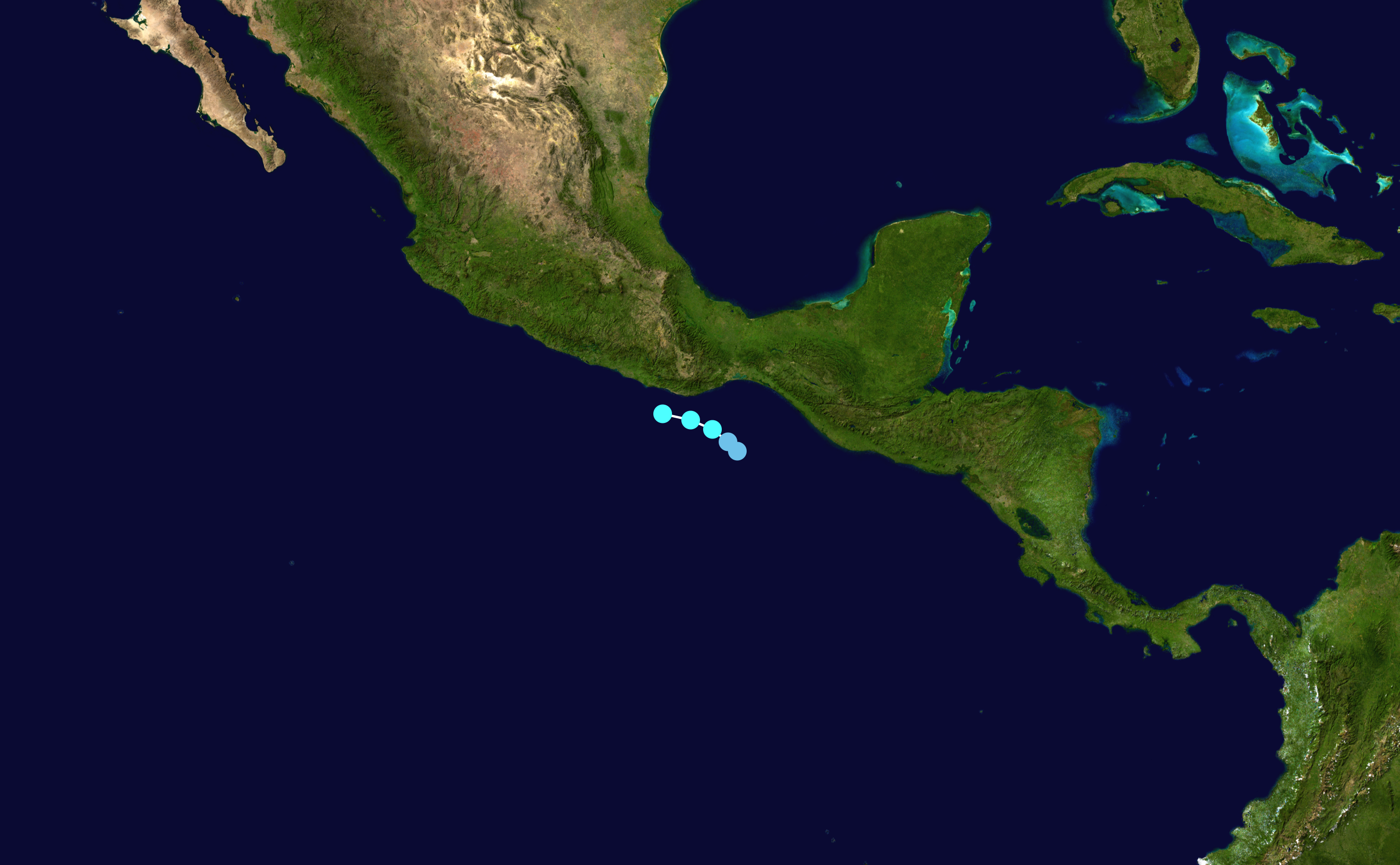
- Duration: October 3 – October 4
- Peak intensity: 45 mph (75 km/h) (1-min); 1002 mbar (hPa)

On October 3, the NHC noted a high chance of tropical development for an area of low pressure, to the south of Mexico. The system increased in intensity and became Tropical Storm Ramon later on the same day. Due to wind shear from a large anticyclone to its north, the storm did not intensify much further. Although Ramon was forecast to linger over open waters as it moved westward, this did not occur and the system quickly grew disorganized. Ramon weakened into a tropical depression on October 4, having lasted as a tropical storm only for 18 hours. As it moved westward, Ramon continued to weaken, until it finally degenerated into a trough of low pressure by 00:00 UTC the following day. The National Hurricane Center issued its last advisory on the degenerate system at 09:00 UTC, on October 5. The remnant low dissipated later that day.

=== Tropical Storm Selma ===
- Tropical storm (SSHWS)
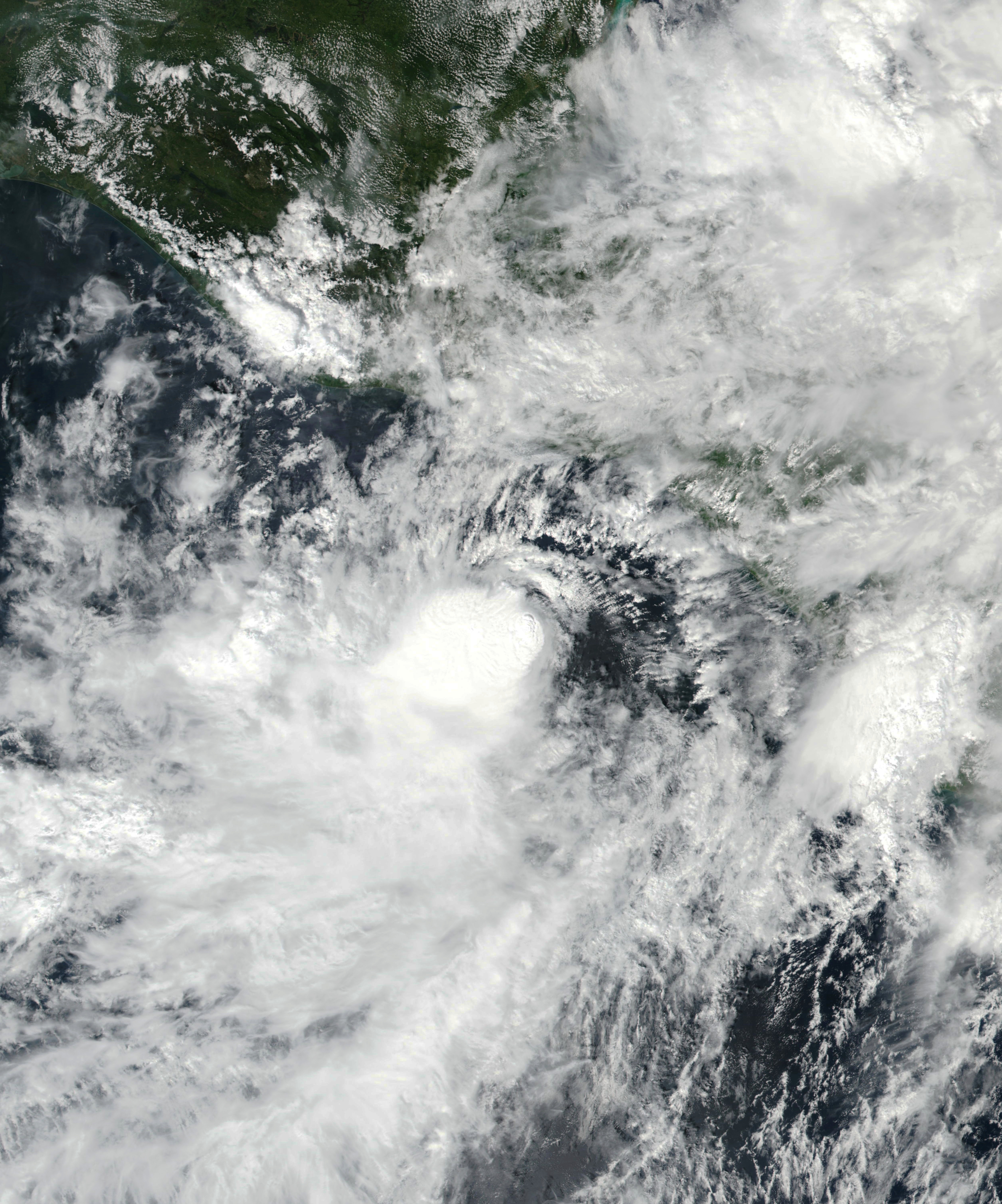
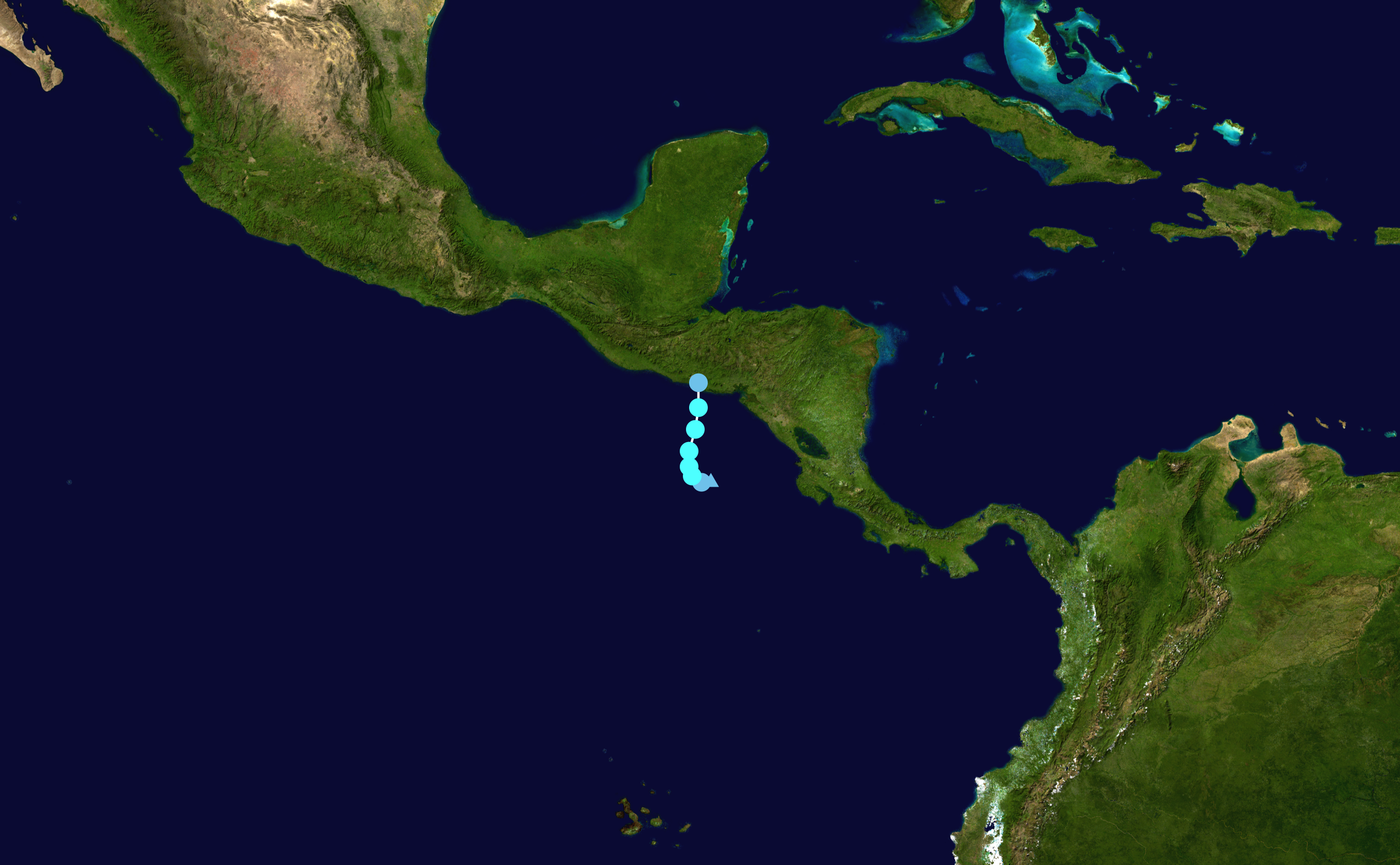
- Duration: October 27 – October 28
- Peak intensity: 40 mph (65 km/h) (1-min); 1004 mbar (hPa)

Late on October 24, the NHC began to monitor the formation of an area of low pressure located south of eastern Central America. The system quickly gained organization as it moved northwestwards, and was declared Tropical Storm Selma at 09:00 UTC on October 27. This marked only the second time that an Eastern Pacific tropical cyclone became a tropical storm east of 90°W, the other being Alma of 2008. With the environment thought to be generally conducive to intensification, Selma was forecast to gain some strength before moving northwards into Central America. However, with wind shear stronger than expected, this did not occur, and Selma never strengthened beyond minimal tropical storm status. Eventually, at 12:00 UTC on October 28, Selma made landfall just southeast of San Salvador, El Salvador, becoming the first Eastern Pacific tropical cyclone to make landfall anywhere in El Salvador. Once over land, Selma weakened quickly, and degenerated into a post-tropical cyclone by 21:00 UTC on October 28. Selma's remnant dissipated overland within the next several hours.

Heavy rains produced by Selma and a cold front resulted in flooding that killed seven people in Honduras. Dozens of landslides damaged homes and blocked roadways while 13 rivers topped their banks. Approximately 38,000 people required evacuation and more than 3,000 homes were flooded as 13 rivers topped their banks. Rainfall extended into Nicaragua, causing floods that claimed another 10 lives in areas recovering from Tropical Storm Nate two weeks prior.

== Storm names ==
The following list of names was used for named storms that formed in the North Pacific Ocean east of 140°W during 2017. This was the same list used for the 2011 season, as no names were retired following that season. No names were retired this season. This list would be reused for the 2023 season.

- Adrian
- Beatriz
- Calvin
- Dora
- Eugene
- Fernanda *
- Greg *
- Hilary
- Irwin
- Jova
- Kenneth
- Lidia
- Max
- Norma
- Otis
- Pilar
- Ramon
- Selma
- Todd (unused)
- Veronica (unused)
- Wiley (unused)
- Xina (unused)
- York (unused)
- Zelda (unused)

Though coincidental and unrelated, various media outlets used the occurrence of Hilary this season to "poke fun" at the name and former U.S. presidential candidate Hillary Clinton.

For storms that form in the North Pacific from 140°W to the International Date Line, the names come from a series of four rotating lists. Names are used one after the other without regard to year, and when the bottom of one list is reached, the next named storm receives the name at the top of the next list. No storms formed within the area in 2017. Named storms in the table above that crossed into the area during the season are noted (*).

== Season effects ==
This is a table of all of the storms that formed in the 2017 Pacific hurricane season. It includes their name, duration (within the basin), peak classification and intensities, areas affected, damage, and death totals. Deaths in parentheses are additional and indirect (an example of an indirect death would be a traffic accident), but were still related to that storm. Damage and deaths include totals while the storm was extratropical, a wave, or a low, and all of the damage figures are in 2017 USD.

Saffir–Simpson scale
TD	TS	C1	C2	C3	C4	C5

2017 Pacific hurricane season statistics
Storm name	Dates active	Storm category at peak intensity	Max 1-min wind mph (km/h)	Min. press. (mbar)	Areas affected	Damage (US$)	Deaths	Ref(s).
Adrian	May 9–10	Tropical storm	45 (75)	1004	None	None	None	
Beatriz	May 31 – June 2	Tropical storm	45 (75)	1001	Southwestern Mexico	$172 million	7	
Calvin	June 11–13	Tropical storm	45 (75)	1004	Southwestern Mexico, Guatemala	$3.88 million	None	
Dora	June 25–28	Category 2 hurricane	105 (165)	974	Southwestern Mexico	Minimal	None	
Eugene	July 7–12	Category 3 hurricane	115 (185)	966	Baja California Peninsula, California	None	None	
Fernanda	July 12–22	Category 4 hurricane	145 (230)	948	Hawaii	None	None	
Eight-E	July 17–20	Tropical depression	35 (55)	1007	None	None	None	
Greg	July 17–26	Tropical storm	60 (95)	1000	None	None	None	
Hilary	July 21–30	Category 2 hurricane	110 (175)	969	Southwestern Mexico	None	None	
Irwin	July 22 – August 1	Category 1 hurricane	90 (150)	979	None	None	None	
Eleven-E	August 4–5	Tropical depression	35 (55)	1006	None	None	None	
Jova	August 11–13	Tropical storm	40 (65)	1003	Western Mexico	None	None	
Kenneth	August 18–23	Category 4 hurricane	130 (215)	951	None	None	None	
Lidia	August 31 – September 3	Tropical storm	65 (100)	986	Western Mexico, Baja California Peninsula, Arizona, California	$123 million	20	
Otis	September 11–19	Category 3 hurricane	115 (185)	965	None	None	None	
Max	September 13–15	Category 1 hurricane	90 (150)	980	Southern Mexico	$76.4 million	4	
Norma	September 14–20	Category 1 hurricane	75 (120)	985	Baja California Peninsula	None	None	
Pilar	September 23–25	Tropical storm	50 (85)	1000	Western Mexico	Minimal	None	
Ramon	October 3–4	Tropical storm	45 (75)	1002	Southern Mexico	None	None	
Selma	October 27–28	Tropical storm	40 (65)	1004	Nicaragua, Costa Rica, El Salvador, Guatemala, Honduras	Unknown	17	
Season aggregates
20 systems	May 9 – October 28		145 (230)	948		$377 million	48	

== See also ==
- Weather of 2017
- Timeline of the 2017 Pacific hurricane season
- List of Pacific hurricanes
- Pacific hurricane season
- Tropical cyclones in 2017
- 2017 Atlantic hurricane season
- 2017 Pacific typhoon season
- 2017 North Indian Ocean cyclone season
- South-West Indian Ocean cyclone seasons: 2016–17, 2017–18
- Australian region cyclone seasons: 2016–17, 2017–18
- South Pacific cyclone seasons: 2016–17, 2017–18
- South Atlantic tropical cyclone
