= Timeline of the 2017 Atlantic hurricane season =

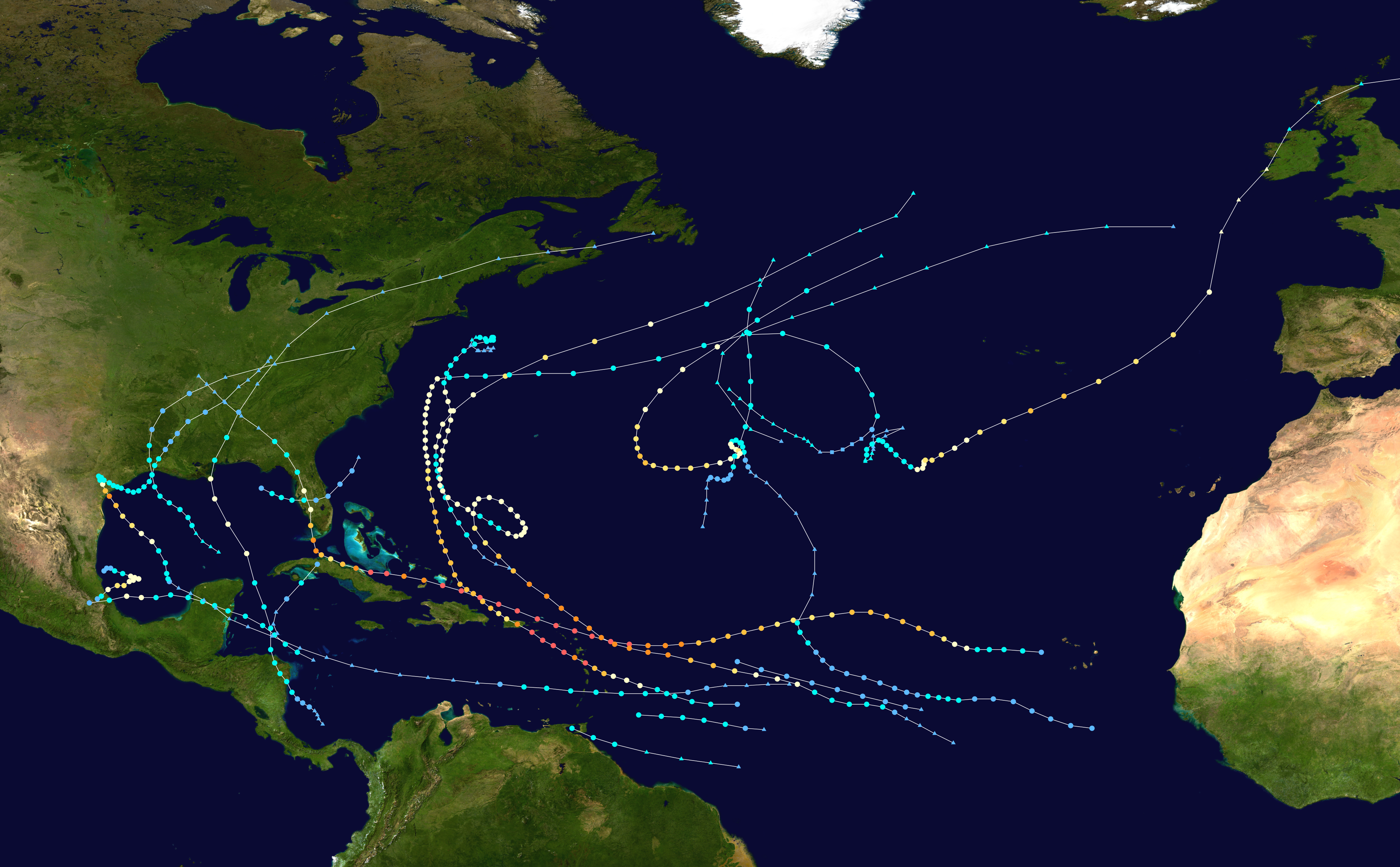
- Season summary map

Season boundaries
- First system formed: April 19, 2017
- Last system dissipated: November 9, 2017

Strongest system
- By maximum sustained winds: Irma
  - Maximum winds: 180 mph (285 km/h) (1-minute sustained)
  - Lowest pressure: 914 mbar (hPa; 26.99 inHg)
- By central pressure: Maria
  - Maximum winds: 175 mph (280 km/h) (1-minute sustained)
  - Lowest pressure: 908 mbar (hPa; 26.81 inHg)

Longest lasting system
- Name: Jose
- Duration: 17.25 days
Storm articles
- Tropical Storm Bret (2017)
- Tropical Storm Cindy (2017)
- Tropical Storm Emily (2017)
- Hurricane Franklin (2017)
- Hurricane Gert (2017)
- Hurricane Harvey
- Hurricane Irma
- Hurricane Jose (2017)
- Hurricane Katia (2017)
- Hurricane Maria
- Hurricane Nate
- Hurricane Ophelia (2017)
- Tropical Storm Philippe (2017)

The 2017 Atlantic hurricane season was an event in the annual tropical cyclone season in the north Atlantic Ocean. This Atlantic hurricane season saw above-normal activity; (Note: An average Atlantic hurricane season, as defined by the National Oceanic and Atmospheric Administration, has 12 tropical storms, six hurricanes and two major hurricanes.) it was the seventh most active season on record and the most active since 2005. The season officially began on June 1, 2017 and ended on November 30, 2017. These dates, adopted by convention, historically describe the period in each year when most tropical systems form. However, storm formation is possible at any time of the year, as demonstrated in 2017 by the formation of the season's first named storm, Tropical Storm Arlene, on April 19. The final storm of the season, Tropical Storm Rina degenerated to a remnant area of low pressure on November 9.

The 2017 season produced 17 named storms, of which 10 became hurricanes including six of which intensified into major hurricanes (Category 3, 4 or 5). Of those six, Harvey and Irma, became the first major hurricanes to make landfall on the continental United States in 12 years; a third hurricane, Nate, did so as well. September was both the most active month in the season and the most active month for Atlantic hurricanes ever recorded. Four long-lived major hurricanes—Irma, Jose, Lee and Maria—moved through the Atlantic Basin, as did the short-lived Hurricane Katia. Overall, more accumulated cyclone energy was generated during September 2017 than during the entire 2016 season. In April 2018, the World Meteorological Organization retired the names Harvey, Irma, Maria, and Nate from its rotating naming lists due to the number of deaths and amount of damage they caused, and they will not be used again for another Atlantic hurricane.

This timeline documents tropical cyclone formations, strengthening, weakening, landfalls, extratropical transitions, and dissipations during the season. It includes information that was not released throughout the season, meaning that data from post-storm reviews by the National Hurricane Center, such as a storm that was not initially warned upon, has been included.

The time stamp for each event is first stated using Coordinated Universal Time (UTC), the 24-hour clock where 00:00 = midnight UTC. The NHC uses both UTC and the time zone where the center of the tropical cyclone is currently located. The time zones utilized (east to west) prior to 2020 were: Atlantic, Eastern, and Central. In this timeline, the respective area time is included in parentheses. Additionally, figures for maximum sustained winds and position estimates are rounded to the nearest 5 units (miles, or kilometers), following National Hurricane Center practice. Direct wind observations are rounded to the nearest whole number. Atmospheric pressures are listed to the nearest millibar and nearest hundredth of an inch of mercury.

== Timeline ==
=== April ===
April 19

- 00:00 UTC (8:00 p.m. AST, April 18) at 31.1°N 42.6°W – Subtropical Depression One develops from an area of low pressure about 980 mi (1,575 km) southwest of the Azores.

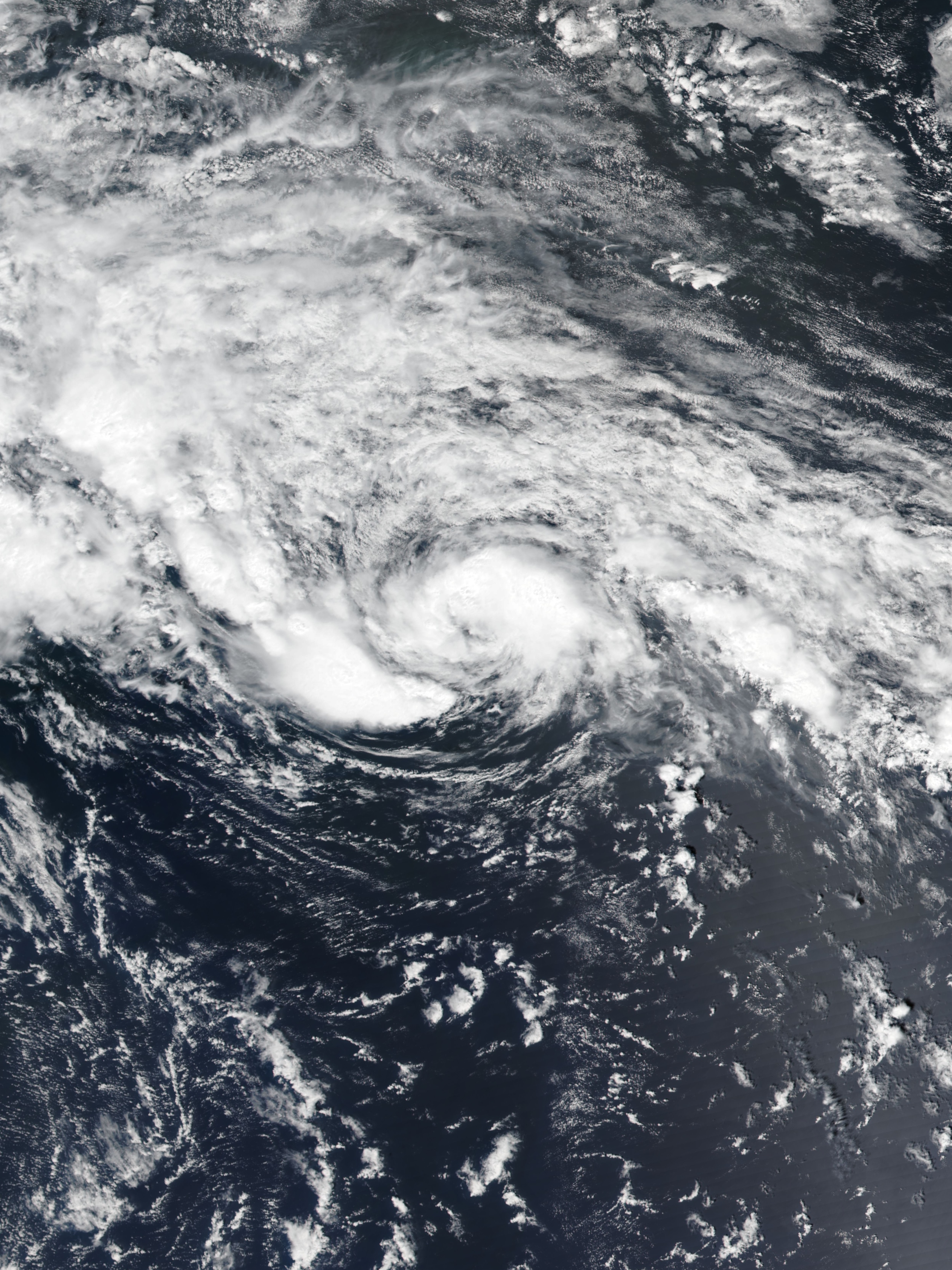
Tropical Storm Arlene west of the Azores on April 20

April 20

- 00:00 UTC (8:00 p.m. AST April 19) at 32.8°N 39.6°W – Subtropical Depression One transitions into Tropical Depression One roughly 775 mi (1,250 km) southwest of the Azores.
- 06:00 UTC (2:00 a.m. AST) at 33.8°N 39.2°W – Tropical Depression One intensifies into Tropical Storm Arlene approximately 720 mi (1,160 km) southwest of the Azores.

April 21

- 00:00 UTC (8:00 p.m. AST April 20) at 39.0°N 43.0°W – Tropical Storm Arlene attains its peak intensity with maximum sustained winds of 50 mph (85 km/h) and a minimum barometric pressure of 990 mbar (990 hPa; 29 inHg), about 805 mi (1,295 km) west of the Azores.
- 12:00 UTC (8:00 a.m. AST) at 39.9°N 49.3°W – Tropical Storm Arlene transitions into an extratropical cyclone roughly 1,135 mi (1,825 km) west of the Azores, and subsequently dissipates.

=== May ===
- No tropical cyclones form in the Atlantic Ocean during the month of May.

=== June ===
June 1

- The 2017 Atlantic hurricane season officially begins.

June 19

- 18:00 UTC (2:00 p.m. AST) at 9.2°N 58.9°W – Tropical Storm Bret forms from a tropical wave about 185 mi (298 km) east-southeast of Trinidad, with a minimum barometric pressure of 1,007 mbar (1,007 hPa; 29.7 inHg). (Note: The National Hurricane Center initiated advisories on this system at 21:00 UTC (5:00 p.m. AST) on June 18, designating it Potential Tropical Cyclone Two.)

June 20

- 02:00 UTC (10:00 p.m. AST) at 10.1°N 61.1°W – Tropical Storm Bret attains peak winds of 50 mph (80 km/h) and makes landfall in southwestern Trinidad.
- 09:00 UTC (5:00 a.m. AST) at 10.6°N 62.6°W – Tropical Storm Bret makes landfall on the Paria Peninsula of Venezuela, with winds of 50 mph (80 km/h), and rapidly degenerates into a remnant low, which later dissipates. (Note: The remnants of Bret moved westward across Central America and into the Eastern Pacific Ocean, where they contributed to the formation of Hurricane Dora on June 24.)
- 18:00 UTC (1:00 p.m. CDT) at 25.6°N 90.6°W – Tropical Storm Cindy forms from a tropical wave about 240 mi (390 km) south-southwest of the mouth of the Mississippi River. (Note: The National Hurricane Center initiated advisories on this system at 21:00 UTC (4:00 p.m. CDT) on June 19, designating it Potential Tropical Cyclone Three.)

June 21

- 00:00 UTC (7:00 p.m. CDT, June 20) at 26.2°N 90.9°W – Tropical Storm Cindy attains peak sustained winds of 60 mph (97 km/h), about 290 mi (465 km) southeast of Cameron, Louisiana.

Infrared satellite loop of Tropical Storm Cindy making landfall in Louisiana on June 22

June 22

- 06:00 UTC (1:00 a.m. CDT) at 29.4°N 93.6°W – Tropical Storm Cindy attains a minimum barometric pressure of 991 mbar (991 hPa; 29.3 inHg), about 35 mi (55 km) west-southwest of Cameron.
- 07:00 UTC (2:00 a.m. CDT) at 29.8°N 93.7°W – Tropical Storm Cindy makes landfall about 25 mi (35 km) west of Cameron, just east of the Sabine Pass, with sustained winds of 50 mph (80 km/h).

June 23

- 00:00 UTC (7:00 p.m. CDT, June 22) at 32.8°N 93.6°W – Tropical Storm Cindy weakens to a tropical depression about 30 mi (45 km) north-northeast of Shreveport, Louisiana.
- 18:00 UTC (1:00 p.m. CDT) at 36.7°N 88.1°W – Tropical Depression Cindy degenerates to a remnant low about 35 mi (56 km) west of Hopkinsville, Kentucky, and subsequently dissipates.

=== July ===
July 5

- 18:00 UTC (2:00 p.m. AST) at 12.0°N 37.1°W – Tropical Depression Four develops from a tropical wave about 1,640 mi (2,640 km) east of the Lesser Antilles.

July 6

- 12:00 UTC (8:00 a.m. AST) at 13.3°N 42.2°W – Tropical Depression Four attains its peak intensity with sustained winds of 30 mph (48 km/h) and a minimum barometric pressure of 1,009 mbar (29.8 inHg), about 1,290 mi (2,075 km) east of the Lesser Antilles.

July 7

- 12:00 UTC (8:00 a.m. AST) at 15.4°N 49.7°W – Tropical Depression Four degenerates into a tropical wave roughly 990 mi (1,595 km) east of the Lesser Antilles, and subsequently dissipates.

July 17

- 06:00 UTC (2:00 a.m. AST) at 10.4°N 49.1°W – A tropical depression develops from a tropical wave about 725 miles (1,167 km) east-southeast of Barbados.
- 12:00 UTC (8:00 a.m. AST) at 10.7°N 50.6°W – The tropical depression intensifies into Tropical Storm Don about 625 mi (1,010 km) east-southeast of Barbados.

July 18

- 00:00 UTC (8:00 p.m. AST, July 17) at 11.2°N 53.8°W – Tropical Storm Don attains its peak intensity with sustained winds of 50 mph (80 km/h) and a minimum barometric pressure of 1,005 mbar (29.7 inHg), about 415 mi (665 km) east-southeast of Barbados.
- 18:00 UTC (2:00 p.m. AST) at 11.5°N 58.7°W – Tropical Storm Don opens up into a tropical wave about 175 mi (280 km) southeast of Barbados and subsequently dissipates.

July 30

- 18:00 UTC (2:00 p.m. EDT) at 28.4°N 85.4°W – Tropical Depression Six forms from an area of low pressure about 165 mi (270 km) west-northwest of St. Petersburg, Florida.

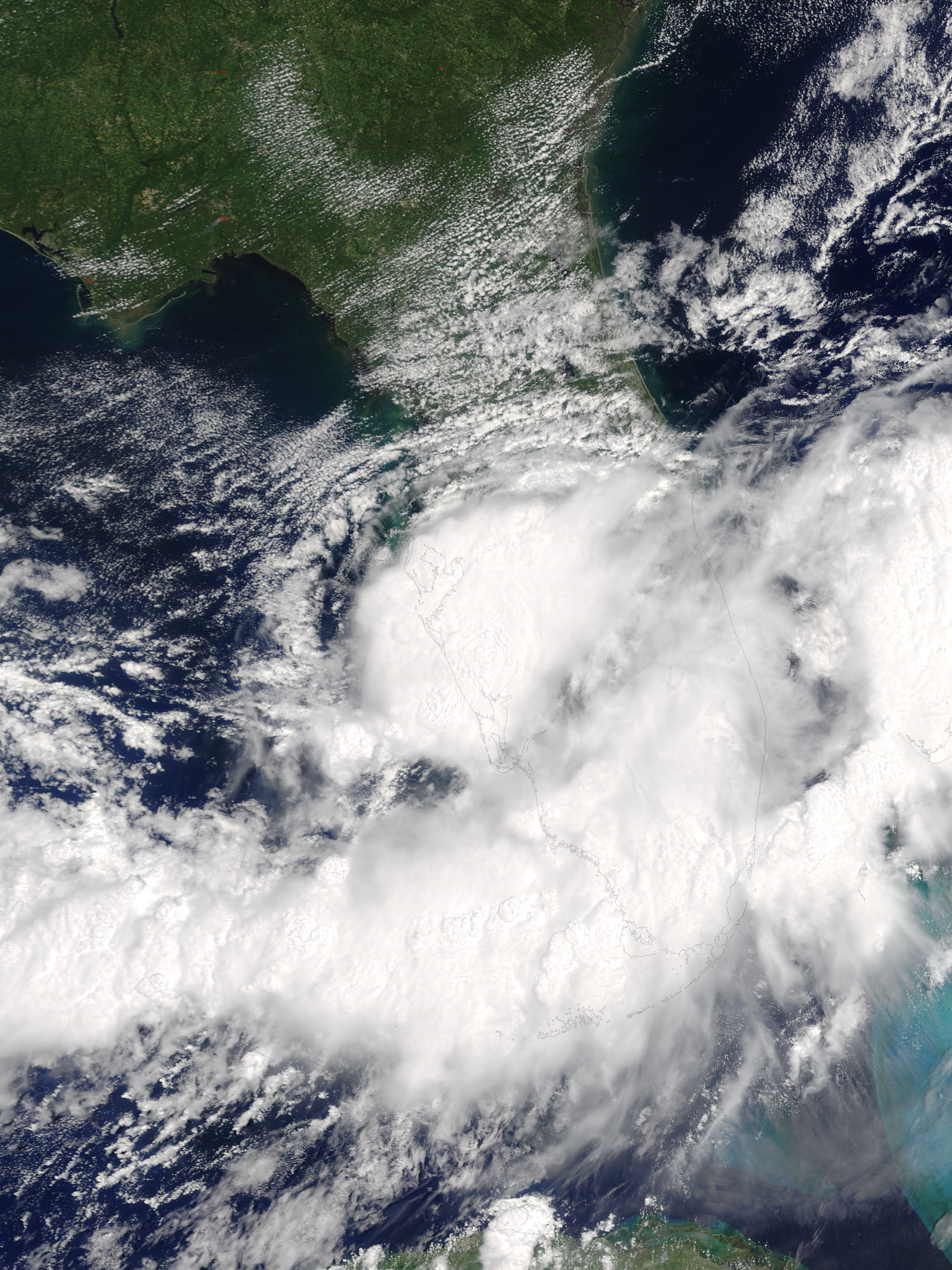
Tropical Storm Emily shortly after Florida landfall on July 31

July 31

- 00:00 UTC (8:00 p.m. EDT, July 30) at 28.0°N 84.6°W – Tropical Depression Six intensifies to become Tropical Storm Emily about 110 mi (180 km) west of St. Petersburg.
- 14:45 UTC (10:45 a.m. EDT) at 27.5°N 82.7°W – Tropical Storm Emily reaches its peak intensity with sustained winds of 60 mph (95 km/h) and a minimum pressure of 1,001 mbar (29.56 inHg) while simultaneously making landfall about 5 mi (10 km) north of Longboat Key, Florida.

=== August ===
August 1

- 00:00 UTC (8:00 p.m. EDT, July 31) at 27.5°N 81.3°W – Tropical Storm Emily weakens to a tropical depression inland, about 85 mi (140 km) east of Longboat Key.

August 2

- 00:00 UTC (8:00 p.m. EDT, August 1) at 30.7°N 78.1°W – Tropical Depression Emily degenerates to a post-tropical cyclone over the Atlantic Ocean, roughly 235 mi (378 km) northeast of Cape Canaveral, Florida, and later dissipates.

August 7

- 00:00 UTC (8:00 p.m. EDT, August 6) at 16.1°N 82.7°W – Tropical Storm Franklin develops from a tropical wave about 85 mi (140 km) north-northeast of Cabo Gracias a Dios on the Honduras–Nicaragua border. (Note: The National Hurricane Center initiated advisories on this system at 21:00 UTC (5:00 p.m. EDT) on August 6, designating it Potential Tropical Cyclone Seven.)

August 8

- 03:45 UTC (10:45 p.m. EDT, August 7) at 19.1°N 87.6°W – Tropical Storm Franklin makes landfall near Pulticub, Quintana Roo, with winds of 60 mph (97 km/h).

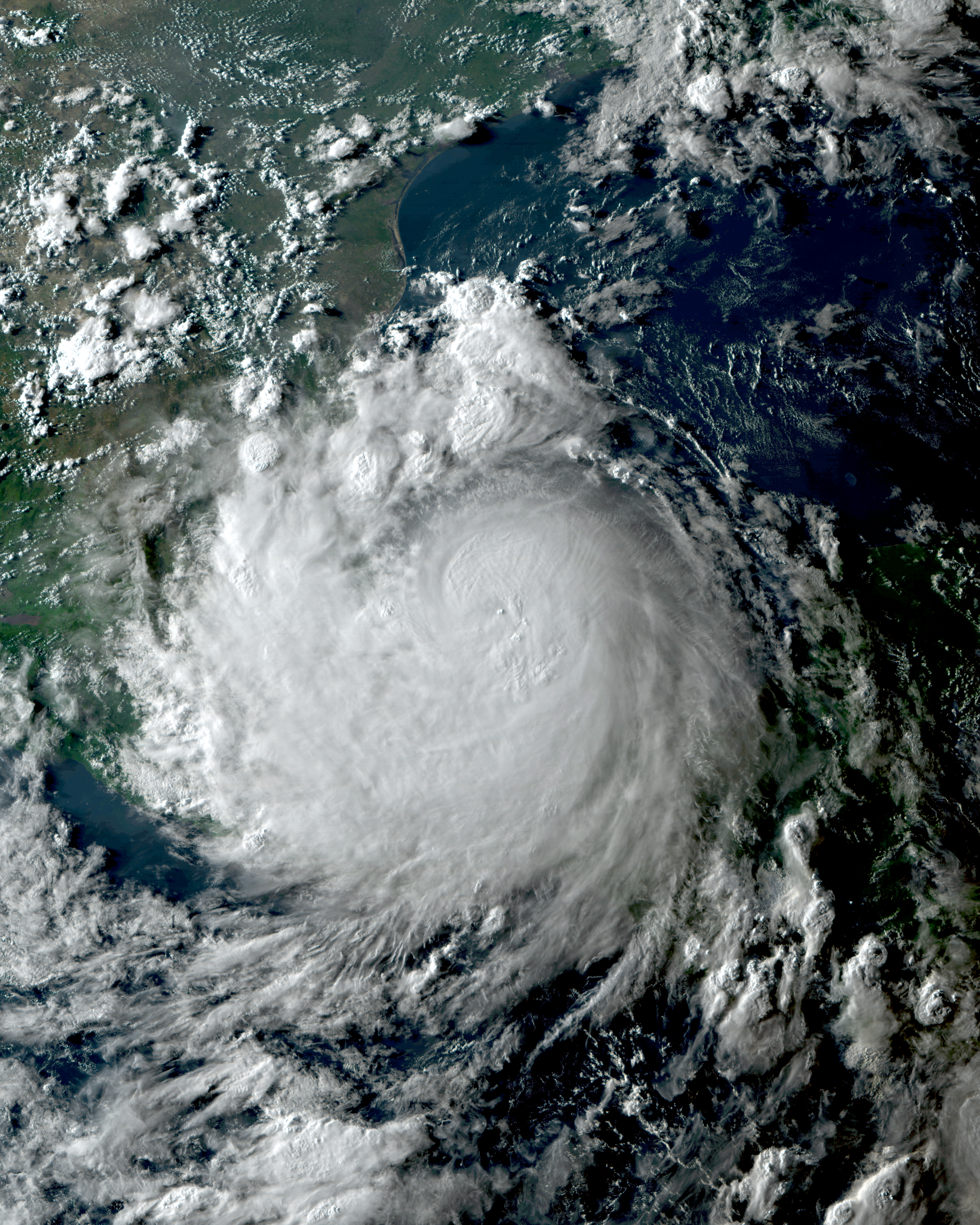
Hurricane Franklin near peak intensity on August 9

August 9

- 00:00 UTC (7:00 p.m. CDT, August 8) at 20.2°N 90.9°W – Tropical Storm Franklin emerges over the Bay of Campeche, 35 mi (55 km) northwest of Campeche City, Campeche.
- 18:00 UTC (1:00 p.m. CDT) at 20.2°N 94.4°W – Tropical Storm Franklin intensifies into a Category 1 hurricane, about 135 mi (217 km) east-northeast of Veracruz City, Veracruz.

August 10

- 00:00 UTC (7:00 p.m. CDT, August 9) at 20.3°N 95.5°W – Hurricane Franklin attains its peak intensity with sustained winds of 85 mph (140 km/h) and a minimum pressure of 981 mbar (28.97 inHg), about 90 mi (150 km) north-northeast of Veracruz City.
- 05:00 UTC (12:00 a.m. CDT) at 20.0°N 96.6°W – Hurricane Franklin makes landfall near Vega de Alatorre, Veracruz, with sustained winds of near 80 mph (130 km/h).
- 06:00 UTC (1:00 a.m. CDT) at 20.0°N 96.8°W – Hurricane Franklin weakens to a tropical storm inland, about 20 mi (30 km) west-southwest of Vega de Alatorre.
- 12:00 UTC (7:00 a.m. CDT) at 19.8°N 98.3°W – Tropical Storm Franklin weakens to a tropical depression about 60 miles (97 km) east-northeast of Mexico City, and later dissipates. (Note: The remnants of Franklin moved westward across Mexico and into the Eastern Pacific Ocean, where they contributed to the formation of Tropical Storm Jova on August 11.)

August 12

- 18::00 UTC (2:00 p.m. EDT) at 24.0°N 69.4°W – Tropical Depression Eight forms from a tropical wave about 265 mi (425 km) northeast of the Turks and Caicos Islands.

August 13

- 00:00 UTC (8:00 p.m. EDT, August 12) at 24.9°N 70.0°W – Tropical Depression Eight intensifies into Tropical Storm Gert about 245 mi (400 km) northeast of the southeastern Bahamas.

August 15

- 06:00 UTC (2:00 a.m. EDT) at 31.5°N 72.3°W – Tropical Storm Gert intensifies into a Category 1 hurricane, about 435 mi (705 km) west of Bermuda.

August 16

- 12:00 UTC (8:00 a.m. AST) at 38.8°N 67.1°W – Hurricane Gert intensifies into a Category 2 hurricane, about 465 mi (750 km) west-northwest of Bermuda.
- 18:00 UTC (2:00 p.m. AST) at 38.2°N 64.1°W – Hurricane Gert attains its peak intensity with maximum sustained winds of 110 mph (175 km/h) and a minimum pressure of 962 mbar (28.41 inHg), about 445 mi (715 km) south-southeast of Halifax, Nova Scotia.

August 17

- 06:00 UTC (2:00 a.m. AST) at 40.7°N 56.2°W – Hurricane Gert weakens to Category 1 strength, about 495 mi (795 km) south of St. John's, Newfoundland and Labrador.
- 06:00 UTC (2:00 a.m. AST) at 13.4°N 52.0°W – The ninth tropical depression of the season develops from a tropical wave about 505 mi (815 km) east of Barbados. (Note: The National Hurricane Center initiated advisories on this system at 15:00 UTC (11:00 a.m. AST) on August 17, designating it Potential Tropical Cyclone Nine.)
- 12:00 UTC (8:00 a.m. AST) at 42.2°N 52.0°W – Hurricane Gert weakens to a tropical storm, about 365 mi (585 km) south of St. John's.
- 18:00 UTC (2:00 p.m. AST) at 44.0°N 48.0°W – Hurricane Gert transitions into an extratropical cyclone, about 335 mi (535 km) southeast of St. John's, and subsequently merges with another extratropical cyclone.
- 18:00 UTC (2:00 p.m. AST) at 13.0°N 55.6°W – The ninth tropical depression intensifies into Tropical Storm Harvey about 270 mi (435 km) east of Barbados.

August 18

- 00:00 UTC (8:00 p.m. AST, August 17) at 13.0°N 56.6°W – Tropical Storm Harvey attains its initial peak windspeed of 45 mph (75 km/h), about 200 mi (325 km) east of Barbados.
- 10:00 UTC (6:00 a.m. AST) at 13.1°N 59.6°W – Tropical Storm Harvey makes landfall on Barbados, with sustained winds of 45 mph (75 km/h).
- 15:00 UTC (11:00 a.m. AST) at 13.2°N 61.2°W – Tropical Storm Harvey makes landfall on St. Vincent, with sustained winds of 45 mph (75 km/h).

August 19

- 12:00 UTC (8:00 a.m. AST) at 13.7°N 67.5°W – Tropical Storm Harvey weakens to a tropical depression about 425 mi (680 km) west of Saint Vincent.
- 18:00 UTC (2:00 p.m. AST) at 13.8°N 69.2°W – Tropical Depression Harvey degenerates to a tropical wave about 540 mi (865 km) west of St. Vincent.

August 23

- 12:00 UTC (7:00 a.m. CDT) at 21.4°N 92.3°W – The remnants of Harvey regenerate into a tropical depression in the Bay of Campeche, about 175 mi (280 km) west of Progreso, Yucatán.
- 18:00 UTC (1:00 p.m. CDT) at 21.6°N 92.4°W – Tropical Depression Harvey re-strengthens into a tropical storm about 175 mi (280 km) west of Progreso.

August 24

- 18:00 UTC (1:00 p.m. CDT) at 24.4°N 93.6°W – Tropical Storm Harvey intensifies into a Category 1 hurricane, about 325 mi (523 km) south-southeast of Port O'Connor, Texas.

August 25

- 06:00 UTC (1:00 a.m. CDT) at 25.6°N 95.1°W – Hurricane Harvey intensifies into a Category 2 hurricane, about 210 mi (340 km) south-southeast of Port O'Connor.
- 18:00 UTC (1:00 p.m. CDT) at 27.1°N 96.3°W – Hurricane Harvey intensifies into a Category 3 hurricane, about 90 mi (140 km) south of Port O'Connor.

August 26

- 00:00 UTC (7:00 p.m. CDT, August 25) at 27.8°N 96.8°W – Hurricane Harvey intensifies into a Category 4 hurricane, about 50 mi (80 km) south-southwest of Port O'Connor.
- 03:00 UTC (10:00 p.m. CDT, August 25) at 28.0°N 96.9°W – Hurricane Harvey attains its peak intensity with sustained winds of 130 mph (215 km/h) and a minimum barometric pressure of 937 mbar (27.67 inHg), and simultaneously makes landfall on San Jose Island, Texas.
- 06:00 UTC (1:00 a.m. CDT) at 28.2°N 97.1°W – Hurricane Harvey weakens to Category 3 intensity as it makes landfall on the northeast end of Copano Bay, near Holiday Beach, Texas.
- 12:00 UTC (7:00 a.m. CDT) at 28.7°N 97.3°W – Hurricane Harvey weakens to Category 1 strength inland, about 40 mi (65 km) north-northwest of Holiday Beach.
- 18:00 UTC (1:00 p.m. CDT) at 29.0°N 97.5°W – Hurricane Harvey weakens to tropical storm strength, about 65 mi (100 km) north-northwest of Holiday Beach.

August 29

- 18:00 UTC (1:00 p.m. CDT) at 28.5°N 94.2°W – Tropical Storm Harvey attains a secondary peak windspeed of 50 mph (85 km/h) in the Gulf of Mexico, about 105 mi (170 km) south-southwest of Cameron, Louisiana.

August 30

- 00:00 UTC (8:00 p.m. AST, August 29) at 16.1°N 26.9°W – The tenth tropical depression of the season develops from a tropical wave, about 140 mi (220 km) west-southwest of São Vicente in the Cabo Verde Islands.
- 06:00 UTC (2:00 a.m. AST) at 16.2°N 28.3°W – The tenth tropical depression develops into Tropical Storm Irma, about 225 mi (360 km) west-southwest of São Vicente.
- 08:00 UTC (3:00 a.m. CDT) at 29.8°N 93.5°W – Tropical Storm Harvey makes its final landfall about 10 mi (20 km) west of Cameron, with sustained winds of 45 mph (75 km/h).

2017 Atlantic Hurricane storm tracks with IMERG precipitation and GOES clouds (from August 10 to September 23)

August 31

- 00:00 UTC (7:00 p.m. CDT, August 30) at 31.3°N 92.6°W – Tropical Storm Harvey weakens to a tropical depression about 110 mi (180 km) northeast of Cameron.
- 06:00 UTC (2:00 a.m. AST) at 16.4°N 32.5°W – Tropical Storm Irma becomes a Category 1 hurricane about 460 mi (740 km) west of the Cabo Verde Islands.
- 18:00 UTC (2:00 p.m. AST) at 17.1°N 34.2°W – Hurricane Irma intensifies to Category 2 strength, about 580 mi (930 km) west of the Cabo Verde Islands.

=== September ===
September 1

- 00:00 UTC (8:00 p.m. AST, August 31) at 17.5°N 35.1°W – Hurricane Irma intensifies into Category 3 hurricane, about 640 mi (1,030 km) west of the Cabo Verde Islands.
- 06:00 UTC (1:00 a.m. CDT) at 34.9°N 88.2°W – Tropical Depression Harvey becomes extratropical over the Tennessee Valley, and subsequently dissipates.

September 2

- 12:00 UTC (8:00 a.m. AST) at 18.9°N 42.6°W – Hurricane Irma weakens into Category 2 hurricane, about 1,260 mi (2,030 km) east of Barbuda.

September 3

- 12:00 UTC (8:00 a.m. AST) at 17.9°N 47.9°W – Hurricane Irma re-strengthens into Category 3 hurricane, about 915 mi (1,470 km) east of Barbuda.

September 4

- 18:00 UTC (2:00 p.m. AST) at 16.7°N 53.9°W – Hurricane Irma intensifies into Category 4 hurricane, about 525 mi (845 km) east of Barbuda.

September 5

- 06:00 UTC (2:00 a.m. AST) at 11.6°N 37.9°W – The eleventh tropical depression of the season develops from a tropical wave about 965 mi (1,550 km) west of the Cabo Verde Islands.
- 12:00 UTC (8:00 a.m. AST) at 16.7°N 57.8°W – Hurricane Irma intensifies to Category 5 strength, about 275 mi (440 km) east-southeast of Barbuda.
- 12:00 UTC (8:00 a.m. AST) at 12.0°N 38.8°W – The eleventh tropical depression develops into Tropical Storm Jose, about 965 mi (1,555 km) west of the Cabo Verde Islands.
- 12:00 UTC (7:00 a.m. CDT) at 22.2°N 97.2°W – Tropical Depression Thirteen develops from a tropical wave about 215 mi (350 km) north-northwest of Veracruz, Veracruz.

September 6

- 05:45 UTC (1:45 a.m. AST) at 17.7°N 61.8°W – Hurricane Irma makes landfall on Barbuda with sustained winds of 180 mph (285 km/h).
- 06:00 UTC (2:00 a.m. AST) at 17.7°N 61.9°W – Hurricane Irma reaches its peak intensity with maximum sustained winds of 180 mph (285 km/h) and a minimum barometric pressure of 914 mbar (26.99 inHg), about 5 mi (10 km) west of Barbuda.
- 06:00 UTC (1:00 a.m. CDT) at 22.2°N 96.4°W – Tropical Depression Thirteen intensifies into Tropical Storm Katia, about 205 mi (335 km) north of Veracruz.
- 11:15 UTC (7:15 a.m. AST) at 18.1°N 63.1°W – Hurricane Irma makes landfall on St. Martin with sustained winds of 180 mph (285 km/h).
- 16:30 UTC (12:30 p.m. ADT) at 18.5°N 64.4°W – Hurricane Irma makes landfall on Virgin Gorda, British Virgin Islands with sustained winds of 180 mph (285 km/h).
- 18:00 UTC (2:00 a.m. AST) at 13.7°N 45.2°W – Tropical Storm Jose becomes a Category 1 hurricane, about 1,150 mi (1,850 km) east of the Leeward Islands.
- 18:00 UTC (1:00 p.m. CDT) at 21.8°N 95.2°W – Tropical Storm Katia becomes a Category 1 hurricane, about 190 mi (305 km) north-northeast of Veracruz.

September 7

- 12:00 UTC (8:00 a.m. AST) at 14.7°N 49.9°W – Hurricane Jose intensifies into a Category 2 hurricane about 830 mi (1,335 km) east of the Leeward Islands.
- 18:00 UTC (2:00 p.m. AST) at 15.1°N 51.5°W – Hurricane Jose intensifies into a Category 3 hurricane about 720 mi (1,160 km) east of the Leeward Islands.

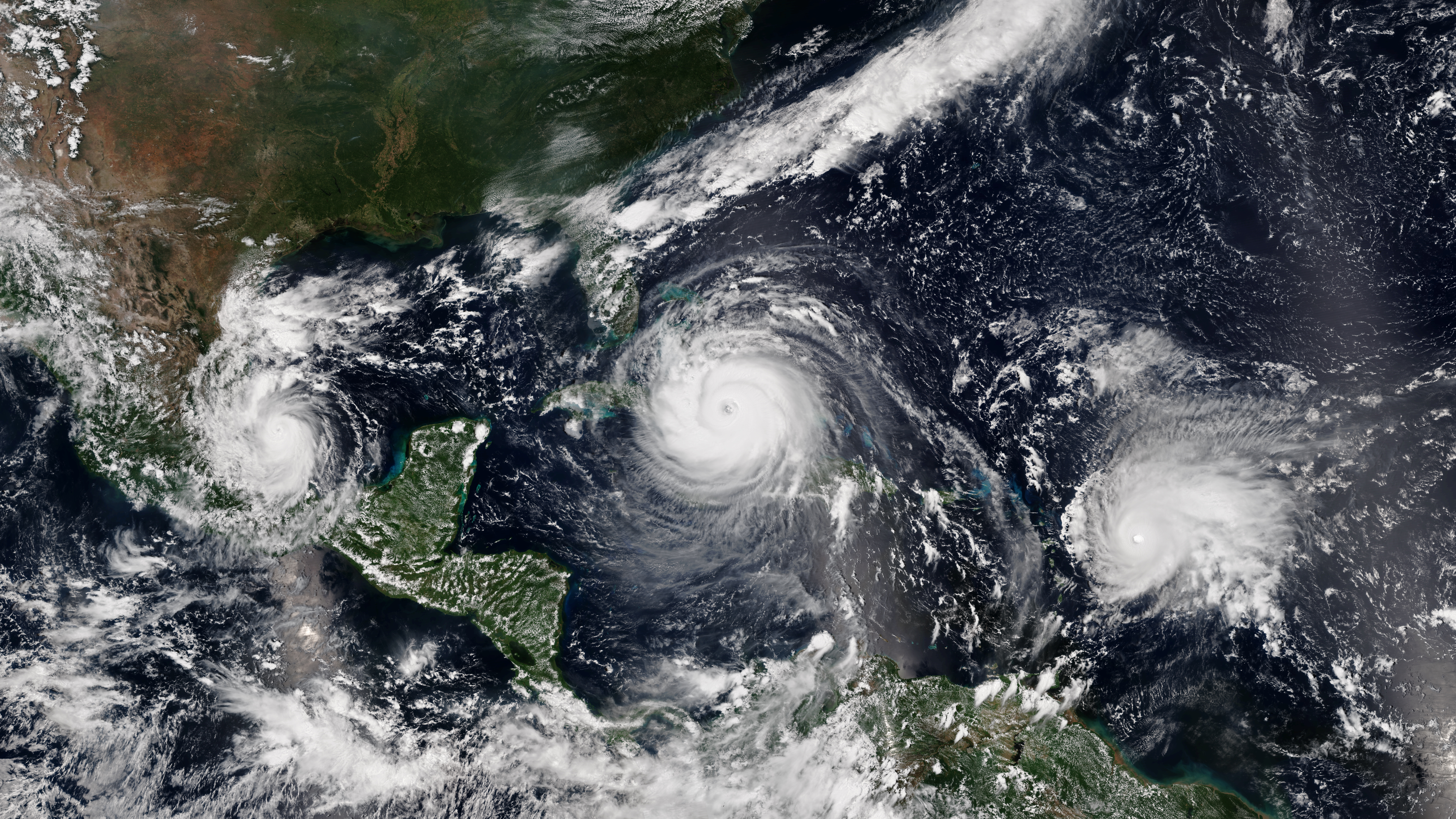
Three simultaneous hurricanes active in the Atlantic on September 8: Katia (left), Irma (center), and Jose (right)

September 8

- 05:00 UTC (1:00 a.m. EDT) at 21.5°N 73.0°W – Hurricane Irma weakens to a Category 4 hurricane and makes landfall on Little Inagua, Bahamas, with sustained winds of 155 mph (250 km/h).
- 06:00 UTC (2:00 a.m. AST) at 15.9°N 54.9°W – Hurricane Jose intensifies into a Category 4 hurricane about 490 mi (785 km) east of the Leeward Islands.
- 12:00 UTC (7:00 a.m. CDT) at 21.1°N 95.7°W – Hurricane Katia intensifies into a Category 2 hurricane about 135 mi (215 km) north-northeast of Veracruz, Veracruz.
- 18:00 UTC (2:00 p.m. EDT) at 22.0°N 76.0°W – Hurricane Irma re-intensifies into a Category 5 hurricane about 125 mi (200 km) east of Cayo Romano, Cuba.
- 18:00 UTC (1:00 p.m. CDT) at 21.1°N 96.2°W – Hurricane Katia attains its peak intensity with maximum sustained winds of 105 mph (165 km/h) and a minimum barometric pressure of 972 mbar (28.70 inHg), about 130 mi (210 km) north of Veracruz.

September 9

- 00:00 UTC (8:00 p.m. AST, September 8) at 16.7°N 58.9°W – Hurricane Jose attains its peak intensity with maximum sustained winds of 155 mph (250 km/h) and a minimum barometric pressure of 938 mbar (27.70 inHg), about 220 mi (350 km) east of the Lesser Antilles.
- 00:00 UTC (7:00 p.m. CDT, September 8) at 20.8°N 96.9°W – Hurricane Katia weakens to a Category 1 hurricane about 120 mi (195 km) north of Veracruz.
- 03:00 UTC (11:00 p.m. EDT, September 8) at 22.3°N 77.9°W – Hurricane Irma makes landfall near Cayo Romano, Cuba, with winds of 165 mph (270 km/h).
- 03:00 UTC (10:00 p.m. CDT September 8) at 20.6°N 97.1°W – Hurricane Katia makes landfall at Tecolutla, Veracruz, with winds of 75 mph (120 km/h).
- 06:00 UTC (2:00 a.m. EDT) at 22.4°N 78.3°W – Hurricane Irma weakens to a Category 4 hurricane in the Jardines del Rey archipelago, about 90 mi (145 km) west of Cayo Romano.
- 06:00 UTC (1:00 a.m. CDT) at 20.3°N 97.4°W – Hurricane Katia weakens to a tropical storm about 110 mi (175 km) northwest of Veracruz.
- 12:00 UTC (8:00 a.m. EDT) at 22.7°N 79.3°W – Hurricane Irma weakens to a Category 3 hurricane about 45 mi (75 km) southeast of Isabela de Sagua, Cuba.
- 12:00 UTC (7:00 a.m. CDT) at 20.1°N 97.7°W – Tropical Storm Katia weakens into a tropical depression about 115 mi (185 km) west-northwest of Veracruz, and later dissipates. (Note: The remnants of Katia moved westward across Mexico and into the Eastern Pacific Ocean, where they contributed to the formation of Hurricane Otis on September 11.)
- 18:00 UTC (2:00 p.m. EDT) at 23.1°N 80.2°W – Hurricane Irma weakens to a Category 2 hurricane about 20 mi (30 km) northwest of Isabela de Sagua.

September 10

- 00:00 UTC (8:00 p.m. EDT, September 9) at 23.4°N 80.9°W – Hurricane Irma re-intensifies into a Category 3 hurricane about 100 mi (160 km) south-southeast of Key West, Florida.
- 06:00 UTC (2:00 a.m. EDT) at 23.7°N 81.3°W – Hurricane Irma re-intensifies into a Category 4 hurricane about 65 mi (100 km) south-southeast of Key West, Florida.
- 13:00 UTC (9:00 a.m. EDT) at 24.7°N 81.5°W – Hurricane Irma makes landfall on Cudjoe Key, Florida, with winds of 130 mph (215 km/h).
- 18:00 UTC (2:00 p.m. EDT) at 25.6°N 81.7°W – Hurricane Irma weakens to a Category 3 hurricane about 30 mi (45 km) south of Marco Island, Florida.
- 18:00 UTC (2:00 p.m. AST) at 22.2°N 66.5°W – Hurricane Jose weakens to a Category 3 hurricane about 355 mi (570 km) northwest of the northern Leeward Islands.
- 19:30 UTC (3:30 p.m. EDT) at 25.9°N 81.7°W – Hurricane Irma makes its final landfall near Marco Island, with winds of 115 mph (185 km/h).

September 11

- 00:00 UTC (8:00 p.m. EDT, September 10) at 26.8°N 81.7°W – Hurricane Irma weakens to a Category 1 hurricane inland, about 15 mi (25 km) east-northeast of Fort Myers, Florida.
- 06:00 UTC (2:00 a.m. AST) at 24.3°N 68.6°W – Hurricane Jose weakens to a Category 2 hurricane about 550 mi (885 km) northwest of the northern Leeward Islands.
- 12:00 UTC (8:00 a.m. EDT) at 29.6°N 82.7°W – Hurricane Irma weakens to a tropical storm about 25 mi (35 km) west of Gainesville, Florida.
- 18:00 UTC (2:00 p.m. AST) at 26.5°N 69.5°W – Hurricane Jose weakens to a Category 1 hurricane about 705 mi (1,130 km) northwest of the northern Leeward Islands.

September 12

- 06:00 UTC (2:00 a.m. EDT) at 32.9°N 85.6°W – Tropical Storm Irma degenerates into a remnant low over central Alabama, and subsequently dissipates.

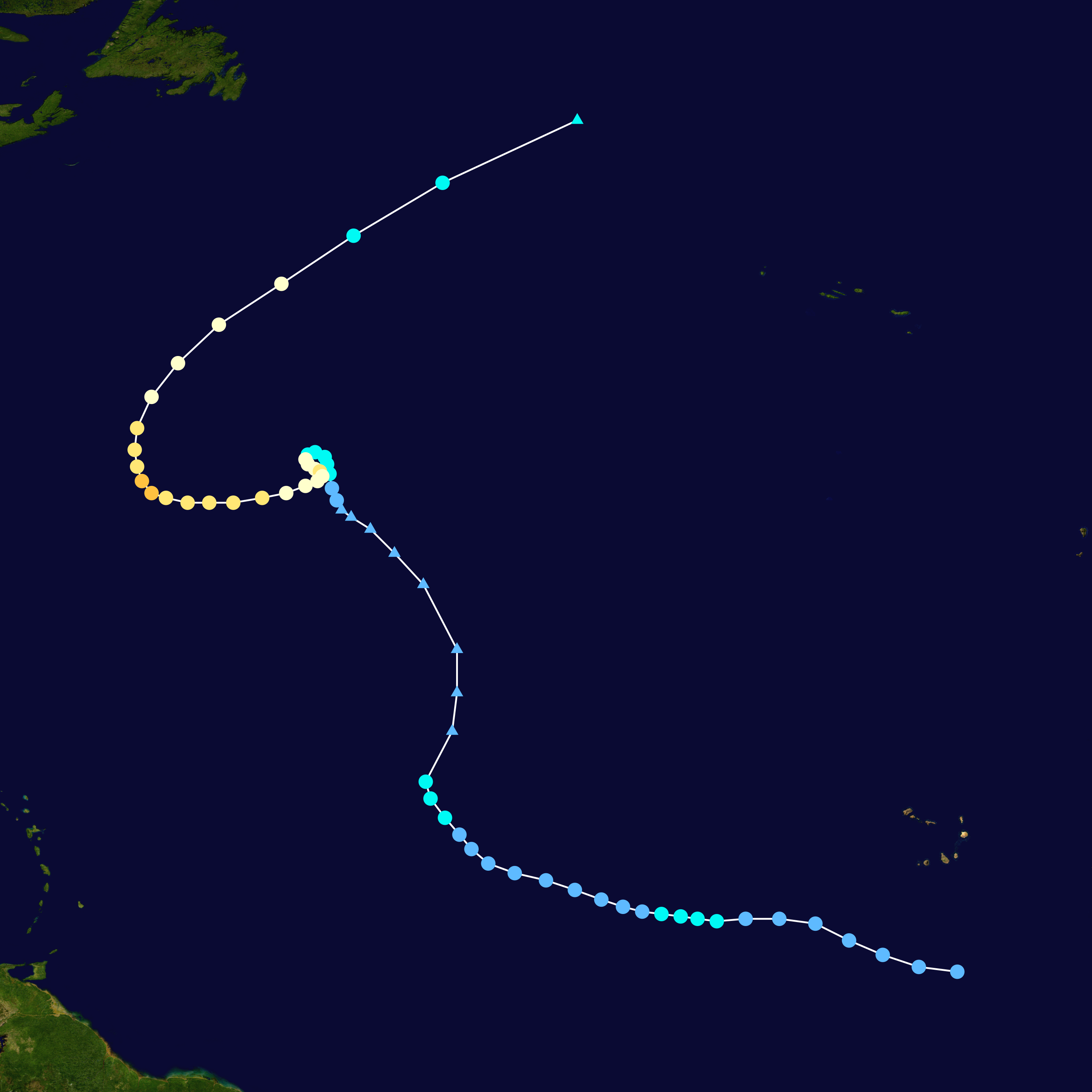
Map plotting the track and the intensity of Lee (starting at lower right corner)

September 14

- 18:00 UTC (2:00 p.m. AST) at 10.4°N 23.1°W – Tropical Depression Fourteen develops from a tropical wave about 305 mi (490 km) south of the Cabo Verde Islands.

September 15

- 00:00 UTC (8:00 p.m. EDT, September 14) at 25.4°N 67.6°W – Hurricane Jose weakens to a tropical storm about 685 mi (1,100 km) northwest of the northern Leeward Islands.
- 18:00 UTC (2:00 p.m. EDT) at 26.8°N 69.9°W – Tropical Storm Jose re-intensifies into a Category 1 hurricane about 845 mi (1,365 km) northwest of the northern Leeward Islands.

September 16

- 12:00 UTC (8:00 a.m. AST) at 12.5°N 33.1°W – Tropical Depression Fourteen intensifies into Tropical Storm Lee about 670 mi (1,080 km) southwest of the Cabo Verde Islands.
- 12:00 UTC (8:00 a.m. AST) at 12.2°N 49.7°W – Tropical Depression Fifteen develops from a tropical wave about 665 mi (1,075 km) east of Barbados. (Note: The National Hurricane Center initiated advisories on this system at 15:00 UTC (11:00 a.m. AST) on September 16, designating it Potential Tropical Cyclone Fifteen.)
- 18:00 UTC (2:00 p.m. AST) at 12.2°N 51.7°W – Tropical Depression Fifteen intensifies into Tropical Storm Maria about 530 mi (850 km) east of Barbados.

September 17

- 12:00 UTC (8:00 a.m. EDT) at 30.5°N 71.9°W – Hurricane Jose attains a secondary peak intensity with sustained winds of 90 mph (150 km/h) and a barometric pressure of 967 mbar (28.56 inHg), about 495 mi (795 km) southeast of Virginia Beach, Virginia.
- 12:00 UTC (8:00 a.m. AST) at 12.9°N 36.2°W – Tropical Storm Lee weakens to a tropical depression about 870 mi (1,395 km) west-southwest of the Cabo Verde Islands.
- 18:00 UTC (2:00 p.m. AST) at 13.6°N 57.0°W – Tropical Storm Maria intensifies into a Category 1 hurricane, about 315 mi (505 km) east-southeast of Dominica.

September 18

- 12:00 UTC (8:00 a.m. AST) at 14.5°N 59.7°W – Hurricane Maria intensifies into a Category 3 hurricane, about 125 mi (200 km) east-southeast of Dominica.

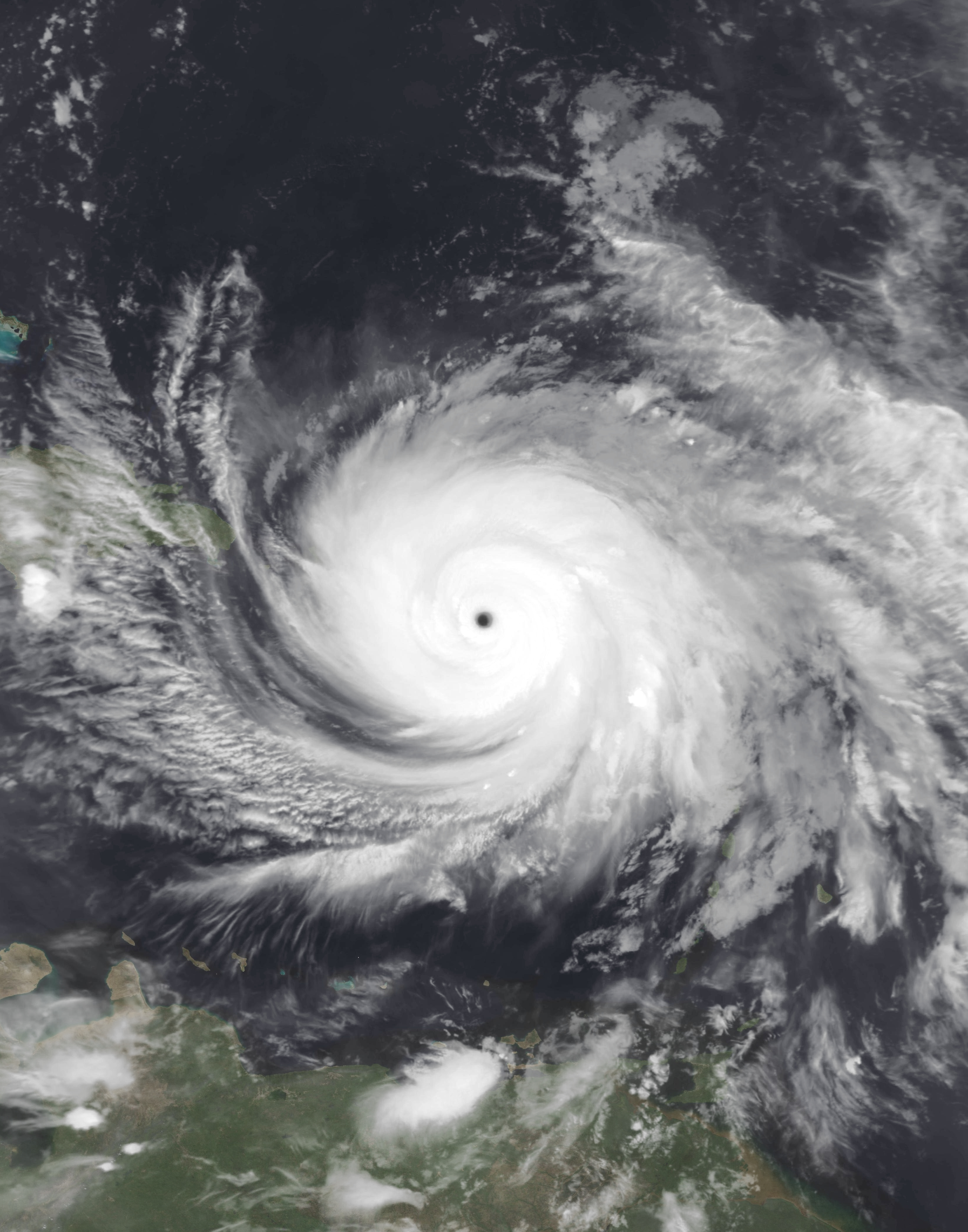
Hurricane Maria near peak intensity, moving towards Puerto Rico, on September 20

September 19

- 00:00 UTC (8:00 p.m. AST, September 18) at 15.3°N 61.1°W – Hurricane Maria intensifies into a Category 5 hurricane, about 15 mi (25 km) east-southeast of Dominica.
- 01:15 UTC (9:15 p.m. AST, September 18) at 15.4°N 61.3°W – Hurricane Maria makes landfall in Dominica with maximum winds near 165 mph (270 km/h).
- 06:00 UTC (2:00 a.m. AST) at 15.7°N 61.9°W – Hurricane Maria weakens to Category 4 strength, about 45 mi (70 km) west-northwest of Dominica.
- 12:00 UTC (8:00 a.m. EDT) at 36.3°N 71.7°W – Hurricane Jose weakens again to a tropical storm, about 240 mi (390 km) east of Virginia Beach.
- 12:00 UTC (8:00 a.m. AST) at 16.1°N 62.7°W – Hurricane Maria re-strengthens into a Category 5 hurricane about 175 mi (285 km) southeast of Saint Croix.
- 18:00 UTC (2:00 p.m. AST) at 16.8°N 44.4°W – Tropical Depression Lee re-intensifies into a tropical storm about 1,105 mi (1,780 km) east of the northern Leeward Islands.

September 20

- 03:00 UTC (11:00 p.m. AST, September 19) at 17.3°N 64.7°W – Hurricane Maria attains its peak intensity with maximum sustained winds of 175 mph (280 km/h) and a minimum barometric pressure of 908 mbar (26.81 inHg), about 30 mi (45 km) south of Saint Croix.
- 10:15 UTC (6:15 a.m. AST) at 18.0°N 65.9°W – Hurricane Maria weakens to a Category 4 hurricane and makes landfall near Yabucoa, Puerto Rico with maximum winds near 155 mph (250 km/h).
- 12:00 UTC (8:00 a.m. AST) at 20.4°N 44.1°W – Tropical Storm Lee degenerates to a trough of low pressure about 1,150 mi (1,850 km) east of the northern Leeward Islands.
- 18:00 UTC (2:00 p.m. AST) at 18.6°N 67.0°W – Hurricane Maria emerges off the northwest coast of Puerto Rico at Category 2 strength, about 15 mi (24 km) west of Arecibo, Puerto Rico.

September 21

- 06:00 UTC (2:00 a.m. AST) at 19.4°N 68.2°W – Hurricane Maria re-strengthens into a Category 3 hurricane about 55 mi (89 km) northeast of Punta Cana, Dominican Republic.

September 22

- 00:00 UTC (8:00 p.m. AST, September 21) at 20.8°N 70.0°W – Hurricane Maria reaches a secondary peak wind speed of near 125 mph (205 km/h), about 70 mi (110 km) southeast of Grand Turk Island.
- 12:00 UTC (8:00 a.m. AST) at 30.0°N 48.9°W – Remnants of Lee regenerate into a tropical depression about 950 mi (1,530 km) east-southeast of Bermuda.
- 18:00 UTC (2:00 p.m. EDT) at 39.7°N 69.1°W – Tropical Storm Jose becomes a post-tropical cyclone about 120 mi (195 km) south-southeast of Nantucket, Massachusetts, and subsequently dissipates.

September 23

- 00:00 UTC (8:00 p.m. AST, September 22) at 31.1°N 49.2°W – Tropical Depression Lee re-intensifies into a tropical storm about 915 mi (1,470 km) east of Bermuda.

September 24

- 06:00 UTC (2:00 a.m. AST) at 31.7°N 50.2°W – Tropical Storm Lee intensifies into a Category 1 hurricane about 850 mi (1,370 km) east of Bermuda.
- 06:00 UTC 2:00 a.m. EDT) at 27.5°N 72.6°W – Hurricane Maria weakens to a Category 2 hurricane, about 560 mi (900 km) south-southeast of Cape Hatteras, North Carolina.

September 25

- 00:00 UTC (8:00 p.m. AST, September 24) at 31.2°N 49.6°W – Hurricane Lee intensifies into a Category 2 hurricane, about 890 mi (1,435 km) east of Bermuda.
- 06:00 UTC (2:00 a.m. AST) at 31.0°N 49.5°W – Hurricane Lee weakens to a Category 1 hurricane, about 900 mi (1,445 km) east of Bermuda.
- 06:00 UTC (2:00 a.m. EDT) at 30.3°N 72.9°W – Hurricane Maria weakens to a Category 1 hurricane, about 370 mi (595 km) south-southeast of Cape Hatteras, North Carolina.

September 26

- 06:00 UTC (2:00 a.m. AST) at 30.1°N 52.0°W – Hurricane Lee re-intensifies into a Category 2 hurricane about 765 mi (1,230 km) east-southeast of Bermuda.

September 27

- 12:00 UTC (8:00 a.m. AST) at 30.3°N 56.6°W – Hurricane Lee intensifies into a Category 3 hurricane, about 500 mi (805 km) east-southeast of Bermuda.
- 18:00 UTC (2:00 p.m. AST) at 30.8°N 57.0°W – Hurricane Lee attains its peak intensity with maximum sustained winds of 115 mph (185 km/h) and a minimum barometric pressure of 962 mbar (28.41 inHg), about 465 mi (750 km) east of Bermuda.

September 28

- 00:00 UTC (8:00 p.m. AST, September 27) at 31.4°N 57.2°W – Hurricane Lee weakens to a Category 2 hurricane about 445 mi (715 km) east of Bermuda.
- 06:00 UTC (2:00 a.m. EDT) at 36.7°N 71.3°W – Hurricane Maria weakens to a tropical storm about 255 mi (415 km) east-northeast of Cape Hatteras.
- 18:00 UTC (2:00 p.m. AST) at 34.3°N 56.6°W – Hurricane Lee weakens to a Category 1 hurricane about 485 mi (780 km) east-northeast of Bermuda.

September 29

- 18:00 UTC (2:00 p.m. AST) at 41.0°N 48.2°W – Hurricane Lee weakens to a tropical storm about 1,085 mi (1,750 km) northeast of Bermuda.

September 30

- 06:00 UTC (2:00 a.m. AST) at 45.8°N 38.9°W – Tropical Storm Lee becomes a post-tropical low about 460 mi (740 km) northwest of the Azores, and later opens up into a trough.
- 18:00 UTC (2:00 p.m. AST) at 41.2°N 45.6°W – Tropical Storm Maria becomes extratropical about 535 mi (860 km) southeast of Cape Race, Newfoundland, and subsequently dissipates.

=== October ===
October 4

- 12:00 UTC (8:00 a.m. EDT) at 12.0°N 81.8°W – Tropical Depression Sixteen forms from an area of low pressure approximately 40 mi (65 km) south of San Andres Island.

October 5

- 06:00 UTC (02:00 a.m. EDT) at 13.1°N 83.1°W – Tropical Depression Sixteen intensifies into Tropical Storm Nate about 100 mi (155 km) west-northwest of San Andres Island.
- 12:00 UTC (08:00 a.m. EDT) at 13.9°N 83.5°W – Tropical Storm Nate makes landfall on the coast of northeastern Nicaragua with winds of 40 mph (65 km/h).

Rainbow infrared satellite loop of Hurricane Nate entering the Gulf of Mexico on October 7

October 7

- 06:00 UTC (1:00 a.m. CDT) at 23.5°N 86.5°W – Tropical Storm Nate intensifies into a Category 1 hurricane over the southeastern Gulf of Mexico, about 420 mi (680 km) south-southeast of the mouth of the Mississippi River.
- 18:00 UTC (1:00 p.m. CDT) at 27.6°N 88.9°W – Hurricane Nate attains its peak intensity with maximum sustained winds of 90 mph (150 km/h) and a minimum barometric pressure of 981 mbar (28.97 inHg), about 105 mi (170 km) south of the mouth of the Mississippi River.

October 8

- 00:00 UTC (7:00 p.m. CDT, October 7) at 29.1°N 89.2°W – Hurricane Nate makes landfall at the mouth of the Mississippi River with maximum winds of 85 mph (140 km/h).
- 05:20 UTC (12:20 a.m. CDT) at 30.4°N 89.0°W – Hurricane Nate makes its final landfall about 5 mi (10 km) west of Biloxi, Mississippi with maximum winds of 75 mph (120 km/h).
- 06:00 UTC (1:00 a.m. CDT) at 30.5°N 88.9°W – Hurricane Nate weakens to a tropical storm inland, about 5 mi (10 km) north of Biloxi.
- 18:00 UTC (1:00 p.m. CDT) at 34.1°N 87.1°W – Tropical Storm Nate weakens into a tropical depression over northern Alabama.

October 9

- 00:00 UTC (8:00 p.m. EDT, October 8) at 36.2°N 85.7°W – Tropical Depression Nate degenerates to a remnant low over central Tennessee.
- 06:00 UTC (2:00 a.m. EDT) at 39.1°N 83.4°W – The remnants of Nate become extratropical over southern Ohio, and subsequently dissipate.
- 06:00 UTC (2:00 a.m. AST) at 30.9°N 40.0°W – Tropical Storm Ophelia develops from an area of low pressure about 875 mi (1,410 km) west-southwest of the Azores.

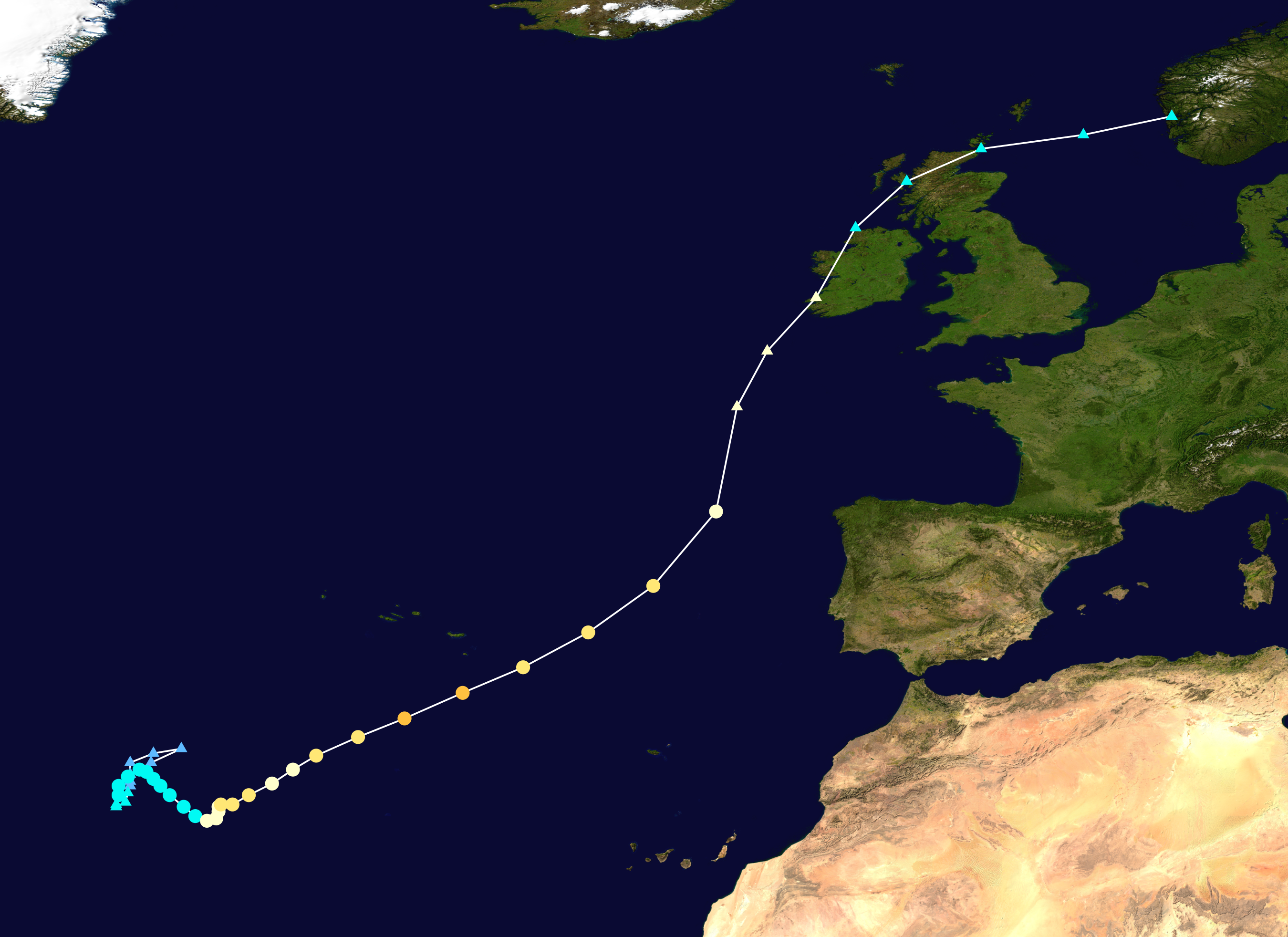
Map plotting the track and the intensity of Ophelia (starting at lower left corner)

October 11

- 18:00 UTC (2:00 p.m. AST) at 29.8°N 36.2°W – Tropical Storm Ophelia intensifies into a Category 1 hurricane about 760 mi (1,220 km) southwest of the Azores.

October 12

- 18:00 UTC (2:00 p.m. AST) at 30.5°N 35.6°W – Hurricane Ophelia intensifies into Category 2 hurricane, about 715 mi (1,150 km) southwest of the Azores.

October 13

- 00:00 UTC (8:00 p.m. AST, October 12) at 30.5°N 35.1°W – Hurricane Ophelia reaches an initial peak windspeed of 105 mph (165 km/h), about 655 mi (1,055 km) southwest of the Azores.
- 12:00 UTC (8:00 a.m. AST) at 31.4°N 33.4°W – Hurricane Ophelia weakens to a Category 1 hurricane about 580 mi (935 km) southwest of the Azores.

October 14

- 00:00 UTC (8:00 p.m. AST, October 13) at 32.6°N 31.5°W – Hurricane Ophelia re-strengthens into a Category 2 hurricane about 460 mi (740 km) southwest of the Azores.
- 12:00 UTC (8:00 a.m. AST) at 34.2°N 27.7°W – Hurricane Ophelia intensifies into Category 3 hurricane and simultaneously attains its peak intensity with maximum sustained winds of 115 mph (185 km/h) and a minimum pressure of 959 mbar (28.32 inHg) about 310 mi (500 km) south of the Azores.

October 15

- 00:00 UTC (8:00 p.m. AST, October 14) at 36.4°N 22.6°W – Hurricane Ophelia weakens to a Category 2 hurricane about 345 mi (550 km) southeast of the Azores.
- 18:00 UTC (2:00 p.m. AST) at 43.1°N 14.3°W – Hurricane Ophelia weakens to a Category 1 hurricane about 625 mi (1,010 km) southwest of Mizen Head, Ireland.

October 16

- 00:00 UTC (8:00 p.m. AST, October 15) at 47.6°N 13.4°W – Hurricane Ophelia becomes an extratropical cyclone about 310 mi (500 km) southwest of Mizen Head, and subsequently dissipates. (Note: Extratropical Ophelia moved across western Ireland, northern Scotland, the North Sea, and southern Norway as a European windstorm.)

October 28

- 12:00 UTC (8:00 a.m. EDT) at 20.1°N 83.5°W – Tropical Depression Eighteen forms from a tropical wave about 100 mi (155 km) south-southwest of Isle of Youth. (Note: The National Hurricane Center initiated advisories on this system at 21:00 UTC (5:00 p.m. EDT) on October 27, designating it Potential Tropical Cyclone Eighteen.)
- 18:00 UTC (2:00 p.m. EDT) at 21.3°N 82.4°W – Tropical Depression Eighteen intensifies into Tropical Storm Philippe and simultaneously attains its peak intensity with winds of 40 mph (65 km/h) and a minimum pressure of 1,000 mbar (29.53 inHg), about 35 mi (55 km) east-southeast of the Isle of Youth.
- 22:00 UTC (6:00 p.m. EDT) at 22.2°N 81.6°W – Tropical Storm Philippe makes landfall along southern coast of the Zapata Peninsula of Cuba, about 30 mi (45 km) west of the Bay of Pigs, with winds of 40 mph (65 km/h).

October 29

- 00:00 UTC (8:00 p.m. EDT October 28) at 22.7°N 81.2°W – Tropical Storm Philippe weakens to a tropical depression inland over west-central Cuba, and later dissipates. (Note: Operationally, Philippe was assessed as crossing the Florida Keys and exiting into the western Atlantic, but post-season analysis showed that this was a non-tropical area of low pressure that was interacting with Philippe.)

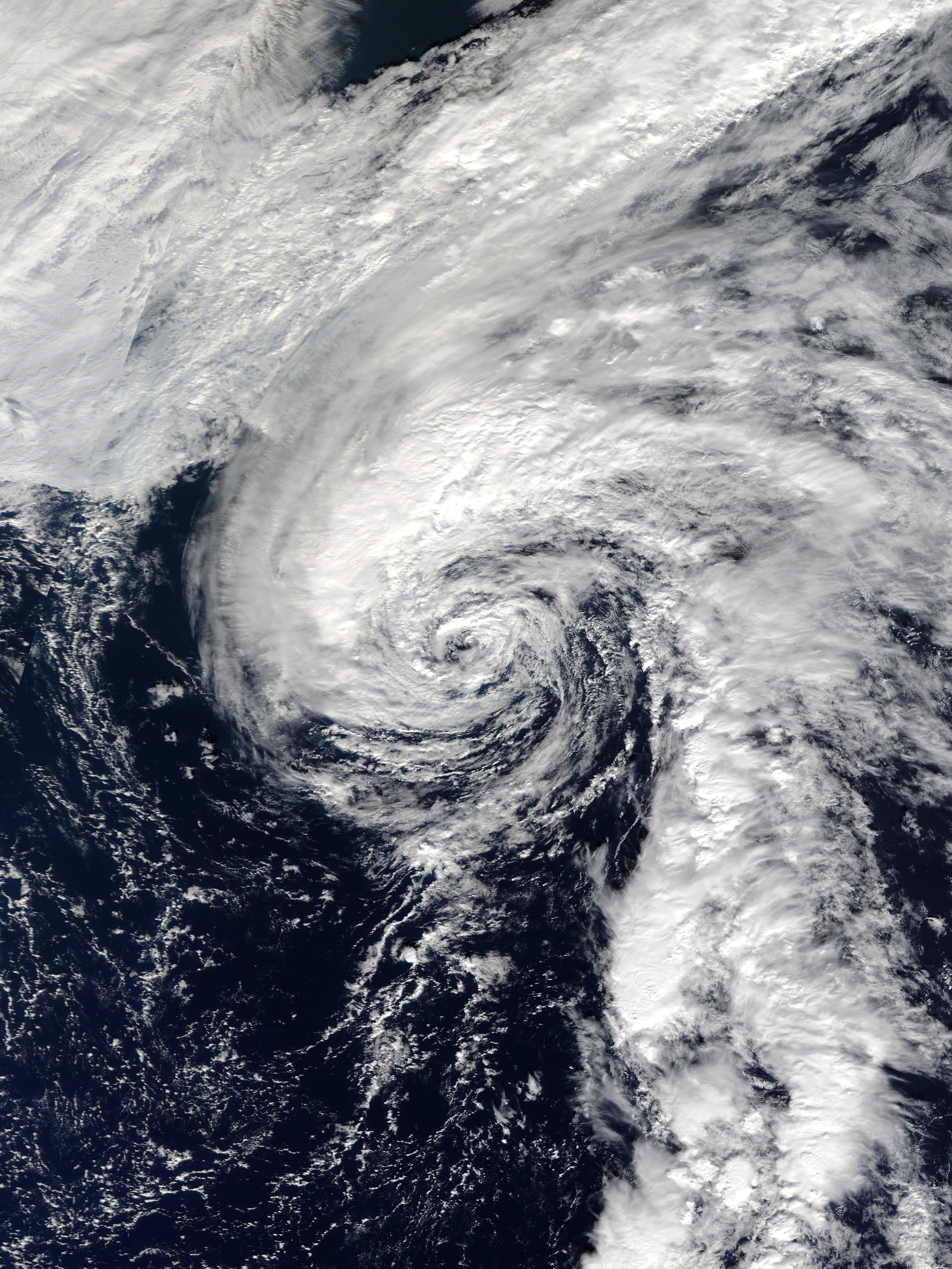
Tropical Storm Rina moving across the northern Atlantic Ocean on November 8

=== November ===
November 5

- 18:00 UTC (2:00 p.m. AST) at 29.2°N 51.7°W – Tropical Depression Nineteen develops from the interaction between a tropical wave and a large mid- to upper-level trough about 805 mi (1,295 km) east-southeast of Bermuda.

November 7

- 00:00 UTC (8:00 p.m. AST November 6) at 30.0°N 50.0°W – Tropical Depression Nineteen intensifies into Tropical Storm Rina about 900 mi (1,445 km) east of Bermuda.

November 8

- 06:00 UTC (2:00 a.m. AST) at 36.4°N 48.7°W – Tropical Storm Rina attains peak sustained winds of 60 mph (95 km/h) about 750 mi (1,205 km) south-southeast of Cape Race, Newfoundland.

November 9

- 00:00 UTC (8:00 p.m. AST, November 8) at 41.8°N 48.8°W – Tropical Storm Rina attains a minimum barometric pressure of 991 mbar (29.26 inHg) about 400 mi (645 km) south-southeast of Cape Race.
- 06:00 UTC (2:00 a.m. AST) at 43.6°N 48.0°W – Tropical Storm Rina becomes a post-tropical cyclone about 345 mi (555 km) southeast of Cape Race, Newfoundland, and later merges with a complex extratropical low pressure area. (Note: This extratropical system, as Cyclone Numa, moved across Europe and later acquired subtropical characteristics, becoming a rare "medicane".)

November 30

- The 2017 Atlantic hurricane season officially ends.

== See also ==
- Lists of Atlantic hurricanes
- Timeline of the 2017 Pacific hurricane season
