= Hurricane Katia (2011) =

Category 4 Atlantic hurricane in 2011

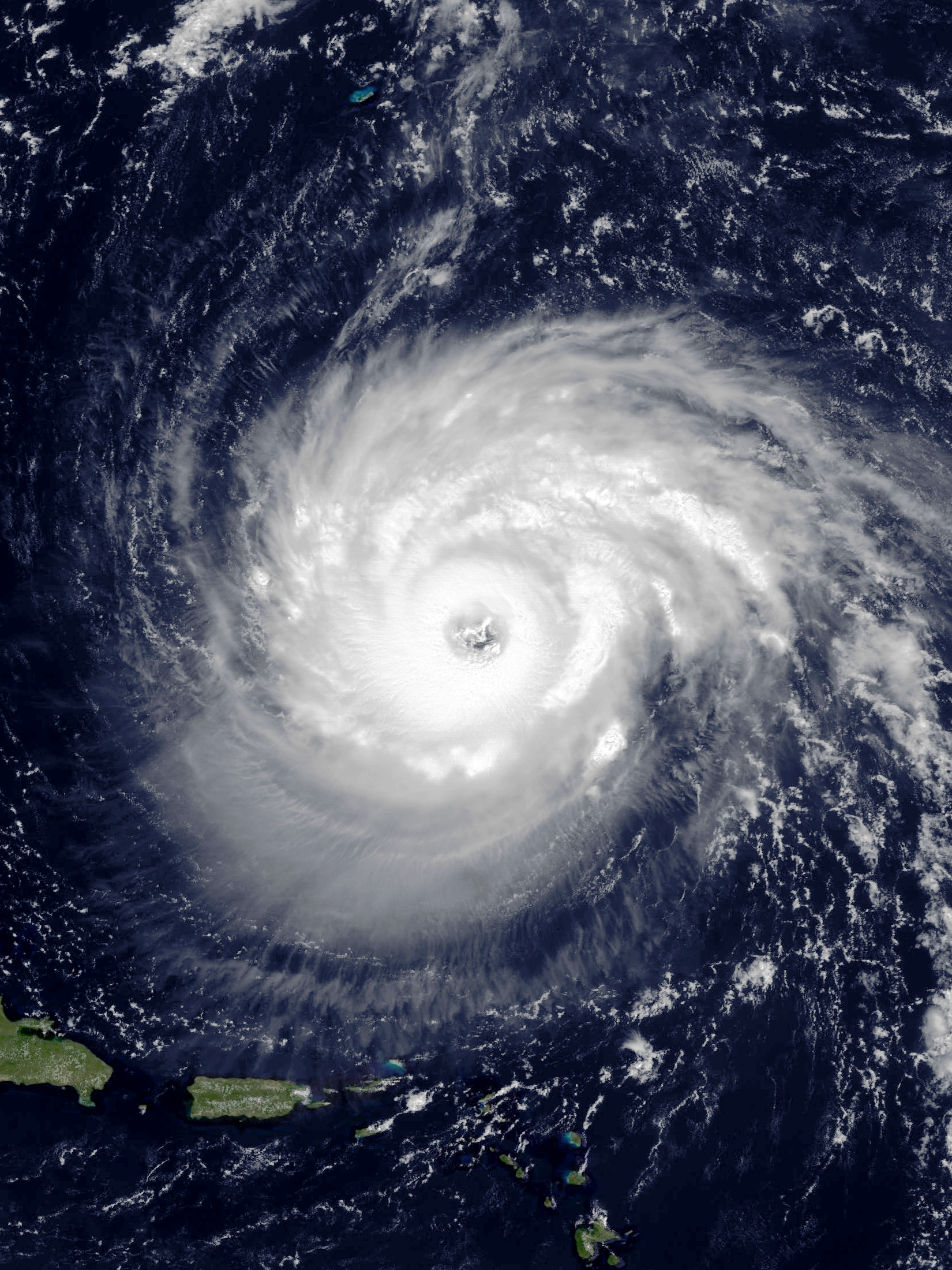
- Hurricane Katia near peak intensity well north of the Virgin Islands on September 5

Meteorological history
- Formed: August 29, 2011
- Extratropical: September 10, 2011
- Dissipated: September 13, 2011

Category 4 major hurricane
- 1-minute sustained (SSHWS/NWS)
- Highest winds: 140 mph (220 km/h)
- Lowest pressure: 942 mbar (hPa); 27.82 inHg

Overall effects
- Fatalities: 3 direct, 1 indirect
- Damage: $157 million (2011 USD)
- Areas affected: Lesser Antilles, East Coast of the United States, United Kingdom, France, Germany, Poland, Latvia, Estonia, Russia
- IBTrACS
- Part of the 2011 Atlantic hurricane season

Hurricane Katia was a powerful tropical cyclone that had substantial impact across Europe as a post-tropical cyclone. The eleventh named storm, second hurricane, and second major hurricane of the active 2011 Atlantic hurricane season, Katia originated as a tropical depression from a tropical wave over the eastern Atlantic on August 29. It intensified into a tropical storm the following day and further developed into a hurricane by September 1, although unfavorable atmospheric conditions hindered strengthening thereafter. As the storm began to recurve over the western Atlantic, a more hospitable regime allowed Katia to become a major hurricane by September 5 and peak as a Category 4 hurricane with winds of 140 mph (230 km/h) that afternoon. Internal core processes, increased wind shear, an impinging cold front, and increasingly cool ocean temperatures all prompted the cyclone to weaken almost immediately after peak, and Katia ultimately transitioned into an extratropical cyclone on September 10.

Although Katia passed well north of the Lesser Antilles, a yellow alert was hoisted for Guadeloupe to notify residents of dangerous seas. Strong rip currents along the East Coast of the United States led to the deaths of two swimmers. After losing its tropical characteristics, Katia prompted the issuance of numerous warnings across Europe. Hurricane-force winds impacted numerous locations, downing trees, toppling power poles, and leaving thousands without electricity. The storm was responsible for two deaths in the United Kingdom: one when a tree fell on a vehicle in County Durham, and another during a multi-car accident on the M54 motorway resulting from adverse weather conditions. The post-tropical cyclone caused approximately £100m ($157 million, 2011 USD) in damage in the United Kingdom alone.

== Meteorological history ==
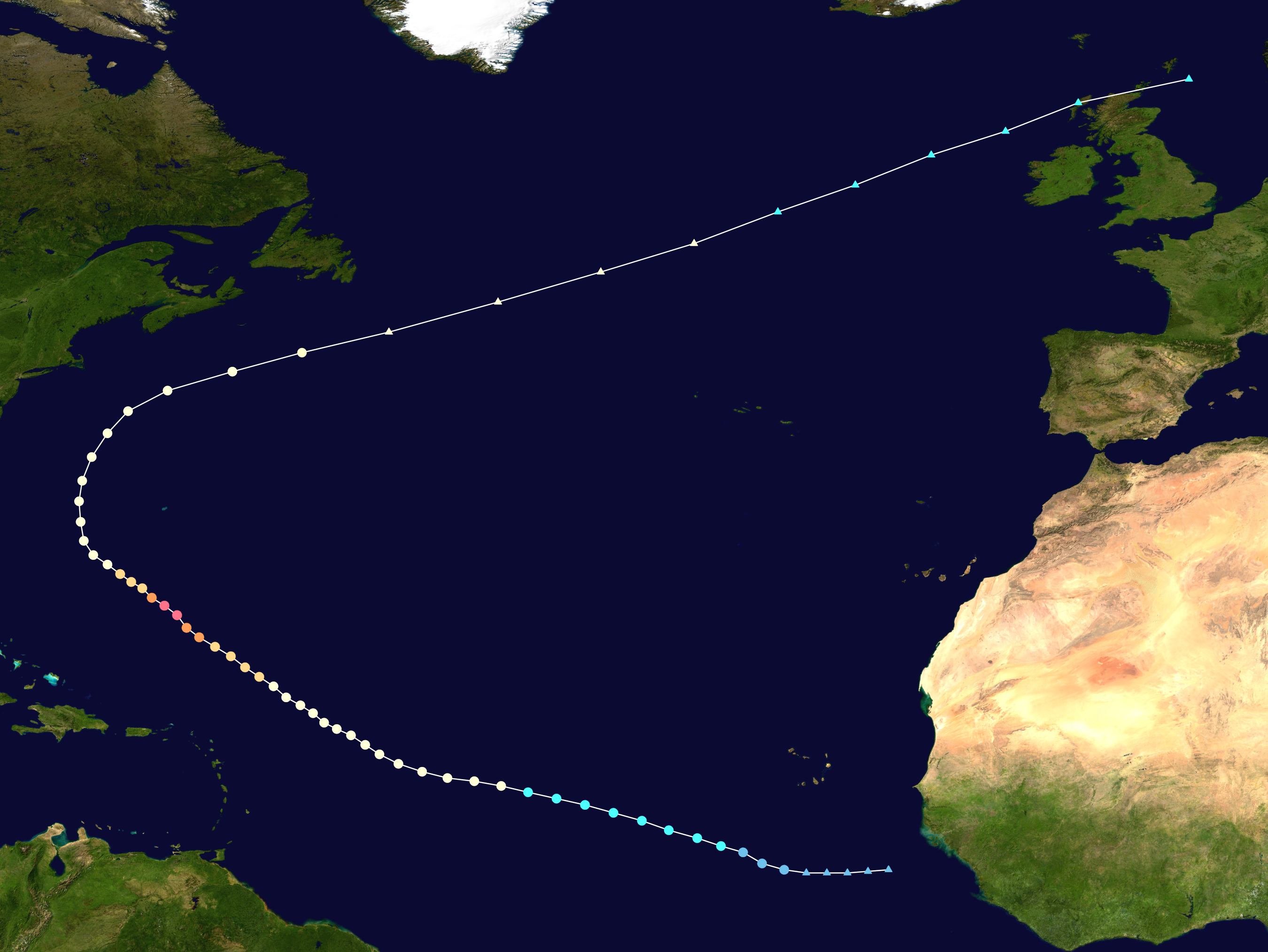
Map plotting the storm's track and intensity, according to the Saffir–Simpson scale Map key Saffir–Simpson scale Tropical depression (≤38 mph, ≤62 km/h) Tropical storm (39–73 mph, 63–118 km/h) Category 1 (74–95 mph, 119–153 km/h) Category 2 (96–110 mph, 154–177 km/h) Category 3 (111–129 mph, 178–208 km/h) Category 4 (130–156 mph, 209–251 km/h) Category 5 (≥157 mph, ≥252 km/h) Unknown Storm type Tropical cyclone Subtropical cyclone Extratropical cyclone, remnant low, tropical disturbance, or monsoon depression

On August 27, the National Hurricane Center (NHC) began monitoring a large mass of convection associated with a tropical wave just off the western coast of Africa. An area of low pressure formed in association with the disturbance the following day, gaining sufficient organization to be declared a tropical depression by 06:00 UTC on August 29 approximately 430 miles (690 km) southwest of the southernmost Cabo Verde Islands. The depression initially struggled upon designation, with its well-defined center displaced near the northeastern edge of the storm's convection as a result of strong east-northeasterly wind shear. By 00:00 UTC on August 30, however, an increase in the cyclone's convective organization marked its intensification into Tropical Storm Katia.

Katia tracked west-northwestward for several days, steered by an expansive mid-level ridge to the cyclone's north. The strong upper-level winds that were affecting the cyclone gradually slackened, allowing for the expansion of a central dense overcast, the formation of a large curved band in the southern semicircle, and development of a banding eye on microwave imagery. Satellite intensity estimates increased accordingly, prompting the NHC to upgrade Katia to hurricane intensity at 00:00 UTC on September 1, while the storm was situated about 1,350 miles (2,170 km) east of the Leeward Islands. Although conditions were forecast to remain conducive for further intensification, water vapor satellite and microwave imagery indicated that mid-level dry air began eroding eyewall convection immediately after the storm's upgrade, and upper-level winds eventually became less favorable as Katia approached a sharp upper-level trough. As a result, the storm maintained its status as a minimal hurricane for almost three days, with only a partial eyewall or banding-eye feature appearing on satellite.

The remnants of Lee (left) and Hurricane Katia (right) on September 6

Early on September 4, the hurricane moved beneath a large upper-level anticyclone which provided a reprieve from the strong southwesterly wind shear. Although its convective organization had yet to become fully symmetrical, an eye became increasingly apparent on infrared imagery. The center moved very near the National Oceanic and Atmospheric Administration's buoy 41044—which registered a maximum sustained wind of 90 mph (140 km/h) and a maximum wind gust of 108 mph (174 km/h)—around 12:00 UTC, indicating that Katia had intensified into a Category 2 hurricane. Although an eyewall replacement cycle briefly caused the storm's convective pattern to deteriorate, Katia attained major hurricane status—a Category 3 or higher on the Saffir–Simpson hurricane wind scale—by 12:00 UTC on September 5. Twelve hours later, the cyclone further intensified into a Category 4 hurricane and attained peak winds of 140 mph (230 km/h) and a minimum barometric pressure of 942 mbar (942 hPa; 27.8 inHg) as its eye warmed, deep convection became much more symmetric about the center, and upper-level outflow expanded.

Almost immediately after attaining peak intensity, Katia began to rapidly weaken as a second eyewall replacement cycle began; it was quickly stunted as dry air wrapped into the western portion of the circulation and northwesterly wind shear increased. The inner core process was completed by early on September 7, allowing Katia to level off in intensity as a Category 1 hurricane for several days. Increasing southwesterly flow resultant from an upper-level trough pushing eastward across the United States caused Katia to slow in forward motion and recurve northeast or east-northeast through September 9. The hurricane re-accelerated late that day, eventually bringing Katia over ocean temperatures near 22 °C (72 °F). Deep convection in association with the storm decreased and its circulation merged with a frontal system, indicating that Katia had completed transition into an extratropical cyclone by 12:00 UTC on September 10 while located about 290 miles (470 km) south-southeast of Cape Race, Newfoundland. Increasing baroclinic energy fueled the powerful extratropical low, which skirted the northern coast of Scotland on September 12, before being absorbed by a larger extratropical system over the North Sea on the following day.

== Preparations and impact ==
=== Lesser Antilles and United States ===
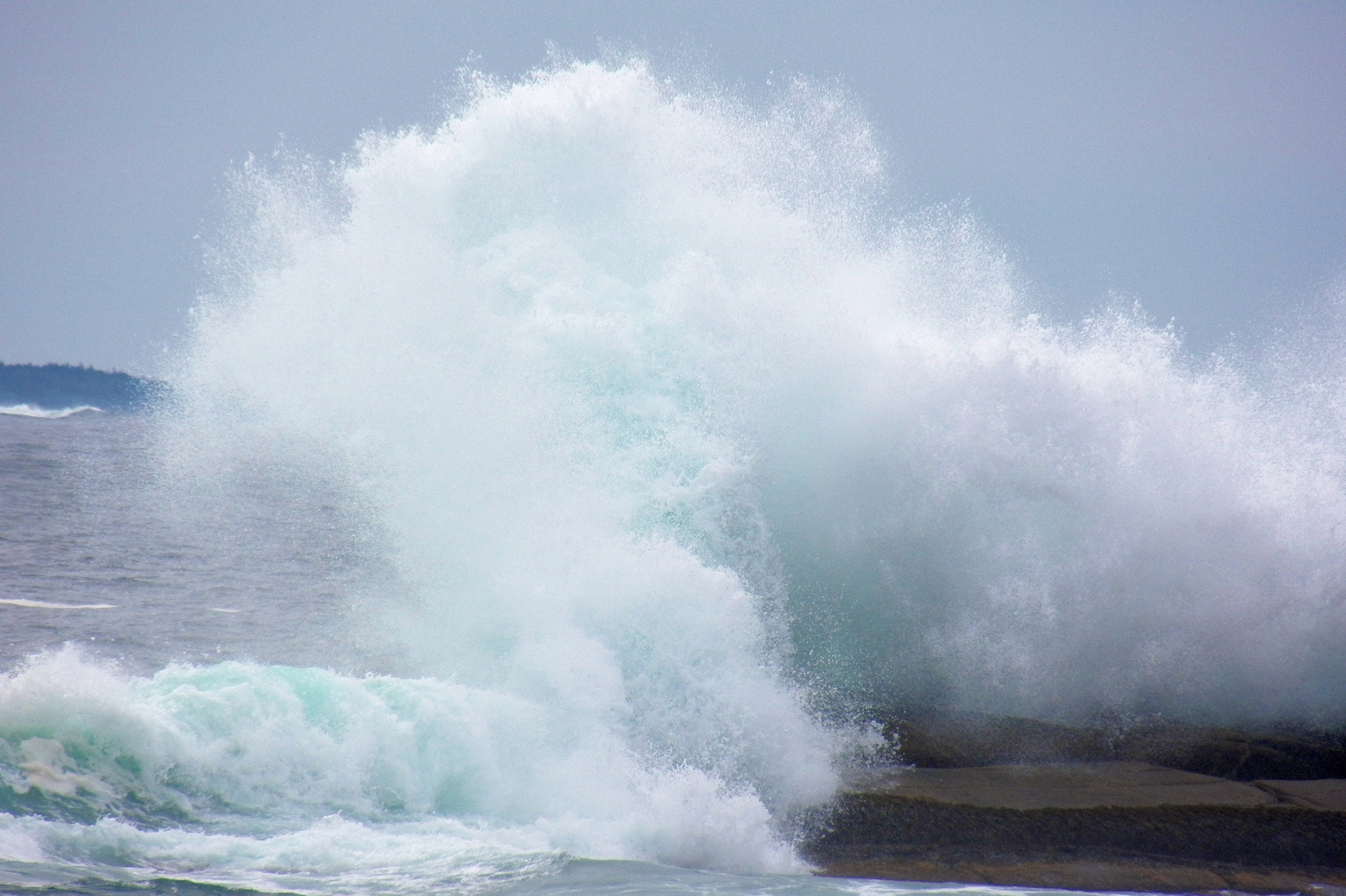
Rough surf from Katia along the southern coast of Nova Scotia

Although Katia passed well northeast of the Lesser Antilles, a yellow alert was hoisted in Guadeloupe for the potential of 3–5 meters (9.8–16.4 ft) swells. Antigua and Barbuda recorded 21.59 millimeters (0.850 in) of rainfall between September 6 and September 7 from an outer band.

On September 4, the NHC noted that large swells likely to cause life-threatening rip current conditions were expected to impact the East Coast of the United States over subsequent days. The increased surf resulted in the death of a swimmer in Ormond Beach, Florida the following day, and a second death off Monhegan, Maine on September 11.

=== Europe ===
After transitioning into a post-tropical cyclone, Katia moved quickly across the North Atlantic and toward Europe, prompting the Met Office to begin warnings citizens for potential impacts over subsequent days on September 9. Three days later, the organization raised a yellow severe weather alert for all of Ireland and most of the United Kingdom, with a more severe amber alert hoisted across Northern Ireland, northern England, and southern Scotland; both alerts warned of the potential for gale-force winds. Concurrently, Met Éireann outlined an extreme weather warning across Ireland, alerting residents to the potential for 130 km/h (81 mph) winds, downed trees, damaged buildings, and flooding. Irish ferries cancelled a number of its sails between Dublin and Holyhead. The Swedish Meteorological and Hydrological Institute warned of gale-force winds along the coastline of Sweden, although a brunt of the rainfall was expected in neighboring Norway.

A maximum wind gust of 158 km/h (98 mph) was recorded on Cairn Gorm, Scotland as Katia impacted the region, with a peak gust of 130 km/h (81 mph) observed at a non-mountain station in Capel Curig, Wales; these observations marked the strongest impact from a tropical cyclone since Hurricane Lili in 1996. Waves up to 15 meters (49 feet) battered the western coastline of Ireland, and fallen power lines temporarily disrupted DART services. Approximately 4,000 households were left without power across the country. A catering marquee was blown into the air on a set for the television series Game of Thrones, causing one injury. In County Durham, United Kingdom, a man was killed after a tree fell on the minivan he was driving; the passenger sustained non-life-threatening injuries. A second driver was indirectly killed on the M54 motorway after hazardous weather caused a multi-car accident. Farther south in Bradford, an 11-year-old boy was injured after he was hit by a portion of a roof blown off a garage. Downed power poles set several fields on fire. The second stage of the Tour of Britain was forcefully canceled after strong winds littered the cycle route with debris. The remnants of Katia produced damage as far east as Russia. In St. Petersburg, wind gusts up to 45 mph (72 km/h) damaged buildings and left roughly 1,500 residents without power. In Estonia, the storm cut off power to approximately 940 households, particularly affecting the island of Hiiumaa and Harju County, with strong winds in coastal areas gusting up to 90 km/h (56 mph).

== See also ==
- Other tropical cyclones of the same name
- Tropical cyclone effects in Europe
- List of Category 4 Atlantic hurricanes
- Hurricane Faith (1966)
- Hurricane Charley (1986)
