= List of storms named Katia =

The name Katia has been used for four tropical cyclones worldwide.

In the Atlantic Ocean: The name replaced Katrina after that name was retired in 2006.

- Hurricane Katia (2011) – powerful Category 4 hurricane that affected Europe as a post-tropical cyclone.
- Hurricane Katia (2017) – small Category 2 hurricane that struck Tecolutla, Mexico as a minimal hurricane.
- Tropical Storm Katia (2023) – formed in the eastern tropical Atlantic and stayed at sea.

In the South-West Indian Ocean:

- Tropical Storm Katia (1970) – a weak tropical storm that approached Madagascar but did not make it to the island.
