= Hurricane Katia (2017) =

Category 2 Atlantic hurricane

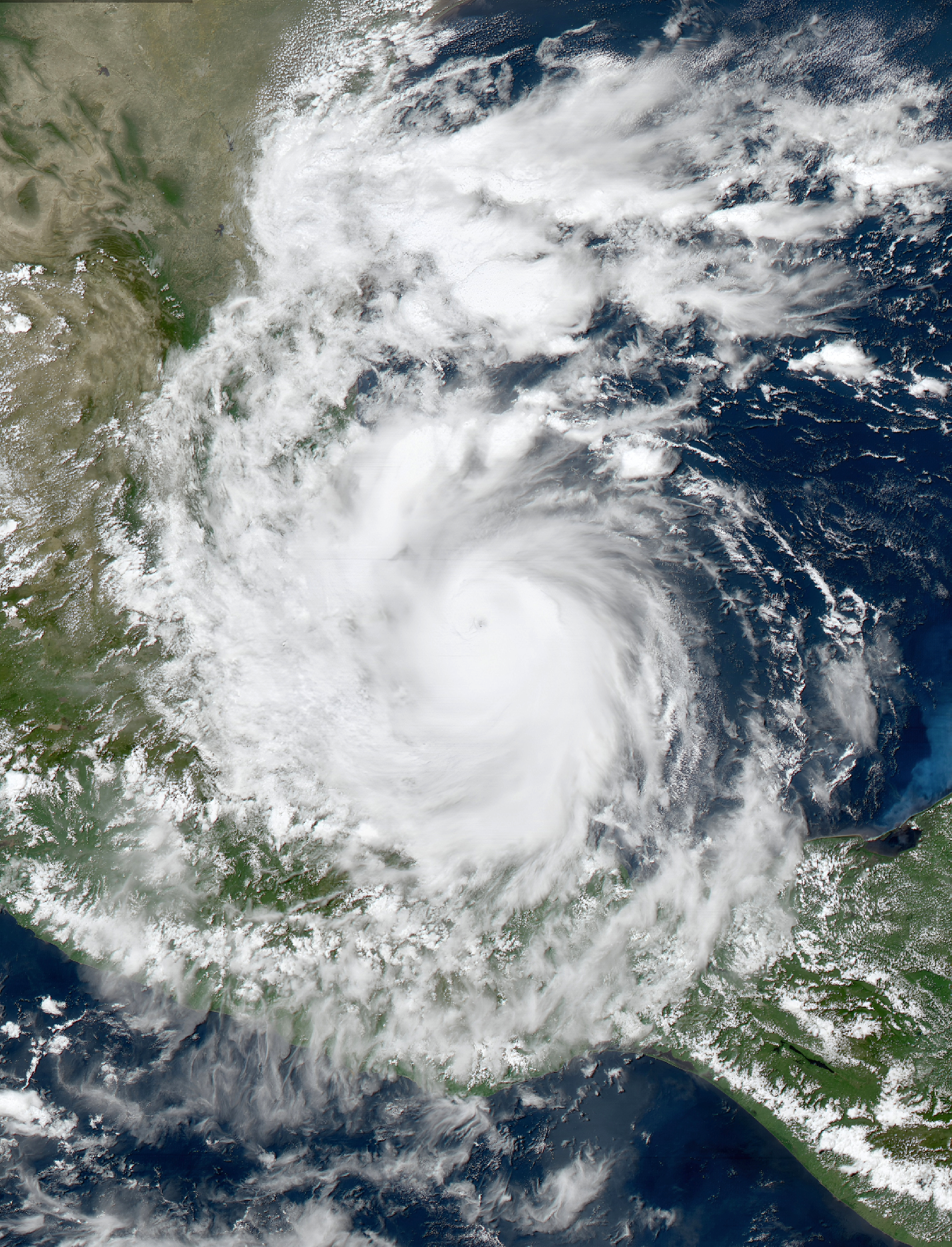
- Hurricane Katia at peak intensity prior to landfall in Veracruz on September 8

Meteorological history
- Formed: September 5, 2017
- Dissipated: September 9, 2017

Category 2 hurricane
- 1-minute sustained (SSHWS/NWS)
- Highest winds: 105 mph (165 km/h)
- Lowest pressure: 972 mbar (hPa); 28.70 inHg

Overall effects
- Fatalities: 3 direct
- Damage: $3.26 million (2017 USD)
- Areas affected: Eastern Mexico
- IBTrACS
- Part of the 2017 Atlantic hurricane season

Hurricane Katia was a strong tropical cyclone which became the most intense storm to hit the Bay of Campeche since Karl in 2010. The eleventh named storm and sixth hurricane of the exceptionally active 2017 Atlantic hurricane season, Katia originated on September 5, out of a broad low-pressure area that formed in the Bay of Campeche. Located in an area of weak steering currents, Katia meandered around in the region, eventually intensifying into a hurricane on September 6. The nascent storm eventually peaked as a 105 mph (165 km/h) Category 2 hurricane on the Saffir–Simpson scale while it began to move southwestward. However, land interaction began to weaken the hurricane as it approached the Gulf Coast of Mexico. Early on September 9, Katia made landfall near Tecolutla at minimal hurricane intensity. The storm quickly dissipated several hours later, although its mid-level circulation remained intact and later spawned what would become Hurricane Otis in the Eastern Pacific.

At least 53 municipalities in Mexico were affected by Katia. Heavy rainfall left flooding and numerous mudslides, with 65 mudslides in the city of Xalapa alone. Although damage estimates were unknown, preliminary reports indicated that 370 homes were flooded. Three deaths were confirmed to have been related to the hurricane, with two from mudslides and one from being swept away in floodwaters. Approximately 77,000 people were left without power at the height of the storm. Coincidentally, the storm struck Mexico just days after a major earthquake struck the country, worsening the aftermath and recovery. Hurricane Katia marked the first instance of three simultaneously active hurricanes since 2010. Katia's peak marked the second known time in Atlantic history and the first time since 1893 that three simultaneously active storms were at least of Category 2 strength.

== Meteorological history ==
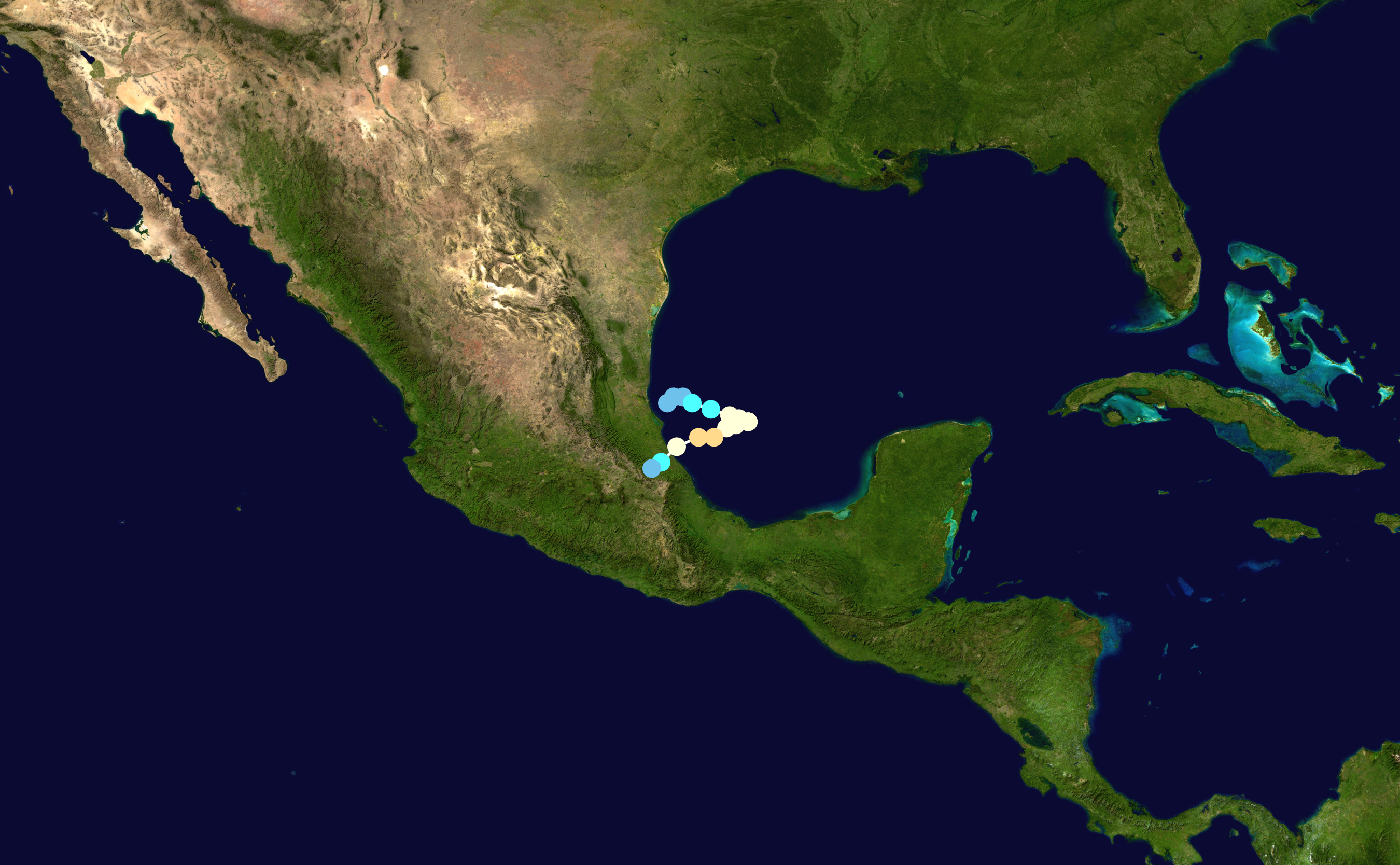
Map plotting the storm's track and intensity, according to the Saffir–Simpson scale Map key Saffir–Simpson scale Tropical depression (≤38 mph, ≤62 km/h) Tropical storm (39–73 mph, 63–118 km/h) Category 1 (74–95 mph, 119–153 km/h) Category 2 (96–110 mph, 154–177 km/h) Category 3 (111–129 mph, 178–208 km/h) Category 4 (130–156 mph, 209–251 km/h) Category 5 (≥157 mph, ≥252 km/h) Unknown Storm type Tropical cyclone Subtropical cyclone Extratropical cyclone, remnant low, tropical disturbance, or monsoon depression

On August 24, a tropical wave emerged into the Atlantic Ocean from the west coast of Africa. Although a concentrated area of deep convection accompanied the wave, thunderstorm activity soon diminished, and the wave progressed westward across the Atlantic and Caribbean Sea with little development for more than a week. The system subsequently interacted with a mid-level trough over the eastern Gulf of Mexico on September 3, and the National Hurricane Center (NHC) began monitoring it for potential tropical cyclogenesis, despite largely unfavorable environmental conditions. Situated over the Yucatán Peninsula and adjacent Bay of Campeche, the system produced disorganized shower and thunderstorm activity. Over subsequent days, conditions became more conducive for development. A well-defined surface circulation formed on September 5, and thus, the system became a tropical depression at 12:00 UTC about 40 mi (65 km) east of the Tamaulipas–Veracruz state line. The NHC initiated advisories on Tropical Depression Thirteen at 21:00 UTC, after ASCAT data indicated a well-defined circulation and winds of 35 mph (56 km/h).

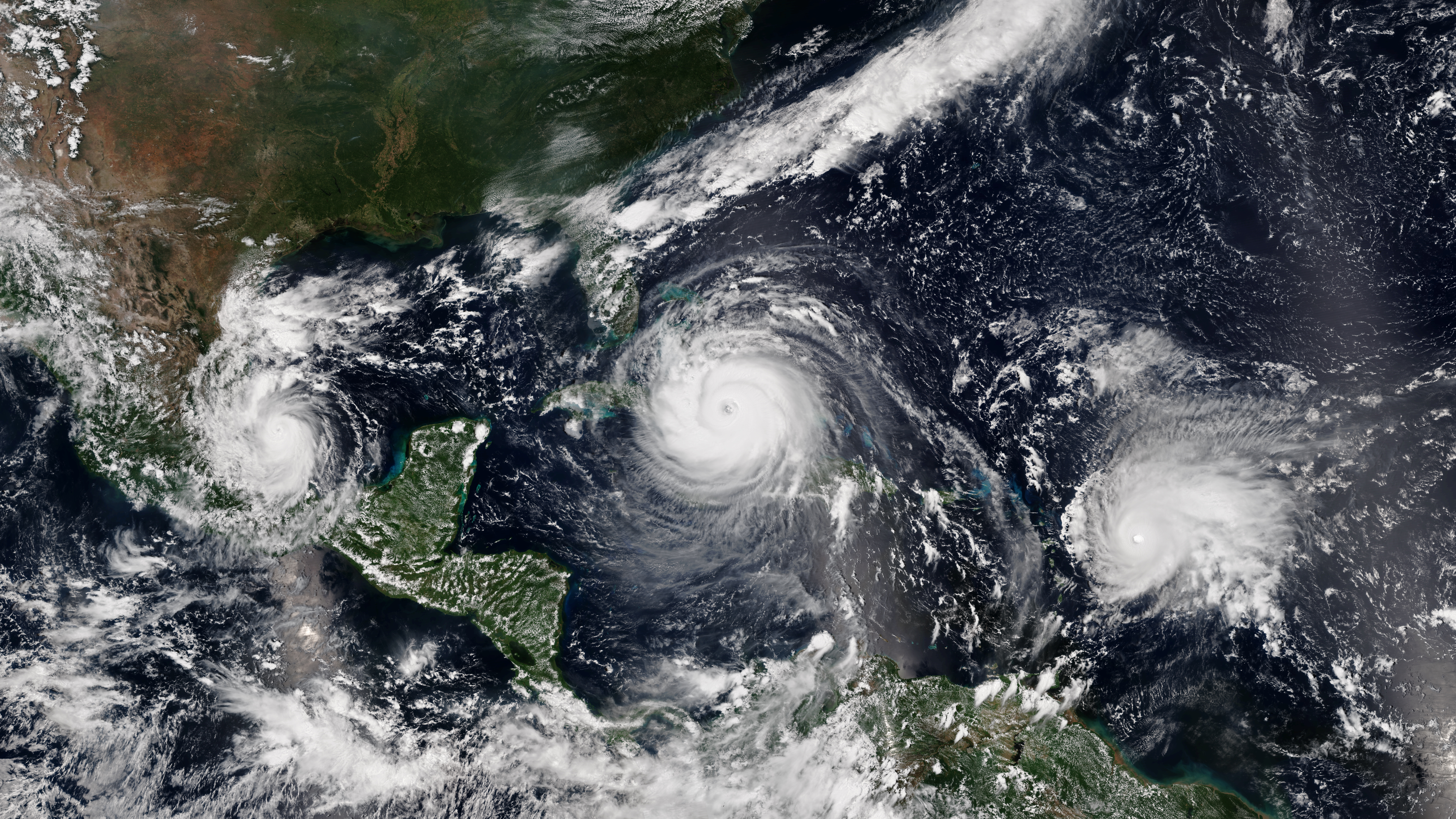
Katia (left) threatening eastern Mexico during the first occurrence of three active Atlantic hurricanes since 2010. Hurricanes Irma and Jose can be seen to the right of Katia.

Located in an area of weak steering currents, the depression drifted slowly eastward. With gradually decreasing wind shear and warm sea surface temperatures, the system intensified into Tropical Storm Katia on September 6, as the convection became better organized. An aircraft reconnaissance flight into the storm later on September 6 found a partial eyewall and surface winds of 76 mph (122 km/h); on that basis, the NHC upgraded Katia to hurricane status. The convection organized into a central dense overcast as the system stalled. With Irma and Jose also being hurricanes at the same time as Katia, it was the first occurrence of three simultaneous hurricanes in the Atlantic basin since Igor, Julia, and Karl in 2010. On September 7, a developing ridge over the northern Gulf of Mexico caused Katia to turn west-southwestwards as it continued to slowly strengthen. The cyclone intensified into a Category 2 hurricane on the Saffir-Simpson scale at 12:00 UTC on September 8; this marked only the second time on record – the other being 1893 – that three hurricanes of at least Category 2 intensity existed simultaneously in the Atlantic basin. Six hours later, Katia reached peak intensity with maximum sustained winds of 105 mph (165 km/h) and a minimum pressure of 972 mbar (hPa; 28.70 inHg).

Thereafter, while Katia approached the coast of Veracruz, its circulation began to interact with land, causing it to quickly weaken. Around 03:00 UTC on September 9, Katia made landfall in Tecolutla with winds of 75 mph (120 km/h). Crossing the rugged terrain of eastern Mexico, the system rapidly weakened and dissipated around 18:00 UTC. Katia's remnants traveled across Central America and later emerged over the Pacific Ocean, where they contributed to the development of Tropical Depression Fifteen-E. This new system later strengthened into Hurricane Otis about a week later.

== Preparations and impact ==
Satellite loop of Katia rapidly weakening before landfall in Veracruz on September 9

In preparation for the storm, tropical cyclone warnings and watches were issued in the state of Veracruz. At 21:00 UTC on September 6, a hurricane watch was issued from Tuxpan to the Laguna Verde Nuclear Power Station, before being extended northward to Cabo Rojo at 03:00 UTC on the next day. The hurricane watch was upgraded to a hurricane warning at 09:00 UTC on September 7, while a tropical storm warning was issued from Cabo Rojo to Pánuco River and from Laguna Verde to the city of Veracruz. The warnings were downgraded and discontinued as Katia moved inland and dissipated, with all warning canceled by 12:00 UTC on September 9. Over 4,000 residents were evacuated from the states of Veracruz and Puebla. The Servicio Meteorológico Nacional warned residents and tourists not to visit Popocatépetl and Pico de Orizaba due to the possibility of lahars. The Protección Civil issued a red alert – the highest level – for northern and central Veracruz, as well as northern and eastern Puebla. An orange alert was declared for southern Tamaulipas and central and southern Puebla. The agency decreed a yellow alert for southern Veracruz, eastern Hidalgo, northern Oaxaca, and Tlaxcala. A green alert was posted for Mexico City, the State of Mexico, and eastern San Luis Potosí. Additionally, a blue alert – the lowest level – was issued for Morelos and Querétaro.

Katia made landfall near Tecolutla in Veracruz as a minimal hurricane on September 9. The cyclone brought floods, mudslides, and strong winds to areas recently devastated by Mexico's most damaging earthquake in over 100 years. The highest 24-hour rainfall total in relation to the hurricane was 11 in (280 mm) in Canseco, Veracruz. Several roads were closed due to inundation, while early reports indicated that about 370 homes were flooded. Katia caused damage in at least 53 of Mexico's municipalities, though damage in each community was generally minimal. About 5.43 in (138 mm) of precipitation fell in Xalapa, equivalent to nearly two months of rainfall. Heavy rainfall resulted in 65 mudslides in 20 neighborhoods of the city and flooded 65 homes. Two fatalities were reported due to the mudslides. The storm toppled 22 trees and a number of branches in the city. Another death occurred after a man was swept away by floodwaters in Jalcomulco. About 77,000 residents were left without power at the height of the storm. The infrastructural damage were counted to be MX$7.2 million (US$407,000), while the insurance loss were estimated at MX$50.5 million (US$2.85 million).

Following the storm, it was requested of the Interior Secretariat to declare a state of emergency in 40 municipalities, granting the authority to use federal funds for disaster relief. The request was approved. The federal government, in coordination with the Mexican Army, distributed approximately 30,000 litres of water and food for about 25,000 people, particularly in the vicinity of Xalapa. The Secretario de Desarrollo Agropecuario, Rural y Pesca (SEDARPA) distributed MX$2.13 million (US$120,000) to those farmers who were affected by the hurricane. As part of the relief effort, several student organizations at Cornell University started penny war fundraisers for victims of Hurricane Katia, as well as hurricanes Irma and Maria.

== See also ==
- Weather of 2017
- Tropical cyclones in 2017
- List of Category 2 Atlantic hurricanes
- Other storms of the same name
- Hurricane Stan (2005)
- Hurricane Nate (2011)
- Hurricane Grace (2021)
