= Hurricane Nate =

Category 1 Atlantic hurricane in 2017

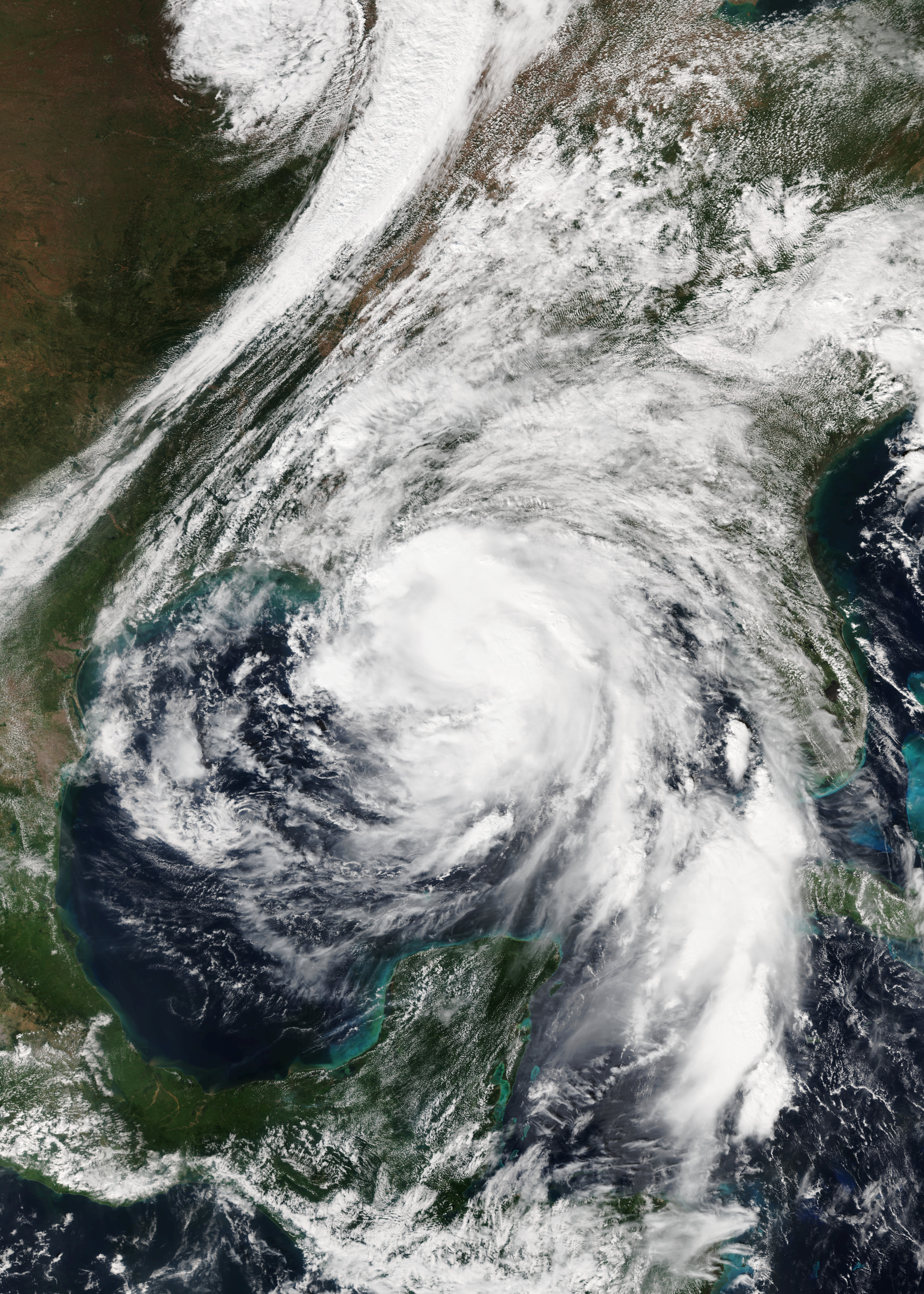
- Hurricane Nate at peak intensity approaching Louisiana on October 7

Meteorological history
- Formed: October 4, 2017
- Extratropical: October 9, 2017
- Dissipated: October 11, 2017

Category 1 hurricane
- 1-minute sustained (SSHWS/NWS)
- Highest winds: 90 mph (150 km/h)
- Lowest pressure: 981 mbar (hPa); 28.97 inHg

Overall effects
- Fatalities: 48
- Damage: $787 million (2017 USD) (Costliest in Costa Rican history)
- Areas affected: Jamaica, Costa Rica, Central America, Cayman Islands, Cuba, Mexico, East Coast of the United States, Atlantic Canada, St Pierre and Miquelon
- IBTrACS
- Part of the 2017 Atlantic hurricane season

Hurricane Nate was a deadly, fast moving and destructive tropical cyclone which was the costliest natural disaster in Costa Rican history. An unusually fast-moving tropical cyclone, it caused severe flooding in Central America, leading to widespread destruction and casualties, during early October 2017, before making landfall on the US Gulf Coast. The fourteenth named storm and ninth hurricane of the extremely active 2017 Atlantic hurricane season, Nate originated from a broad area of low pressure over the southwestern Caribbean on October 3. The disturbance moved northwest, organizing into a tropical depression the next day and attaining tropical storm intensity early on October 5. The storm made landfall in Nicaragua that same day and continued into Honduras with little change in strength. Nate began steady intensification over the warm waters of the northwestern Caribbean Sea shortly thereafter. It attained hurricane strength while moving through the Yucatán Channel early on October 7, attaining peak winds of 90 mph (150 km/h) in the central Gulf of Mexico later that day. Early on the next day, Nate made landfall near the mouth of the Mississippi River in Louisiana. After crossing the marshland of the Mississippi Delta, it made its second U.S. landfall near Biloxi, Mississippi early on October 8, causing a storm surge to flood the ground floors of coastal casinos and buildings, as well as causing rip currents, hurricane-force winds, and beach erosion.

Moving northwestward at 29 mph (47 km/h), Nate was the fastest-moving tropical system ever recorded in the Gulf of Mexico. It is also the fourth Atlantic hurricane of 2017 to have made landfall in the United States or one of its territories; such a quartet of landfalls has not occurred since 2005. In addition, Nate was the first tropical cyclone to move ashore in the state of Mississippi since Hurricane Katrina.

A total of 48 deaths were attributed to Nate: 16 deaths were counted in Nicaragua, 14 in Costa Rica, 5 in Guatemala, 7 in Panama, 3 in Honduras, 1 in El Salvador, and 2 in the United States.

== Meteorological history ==
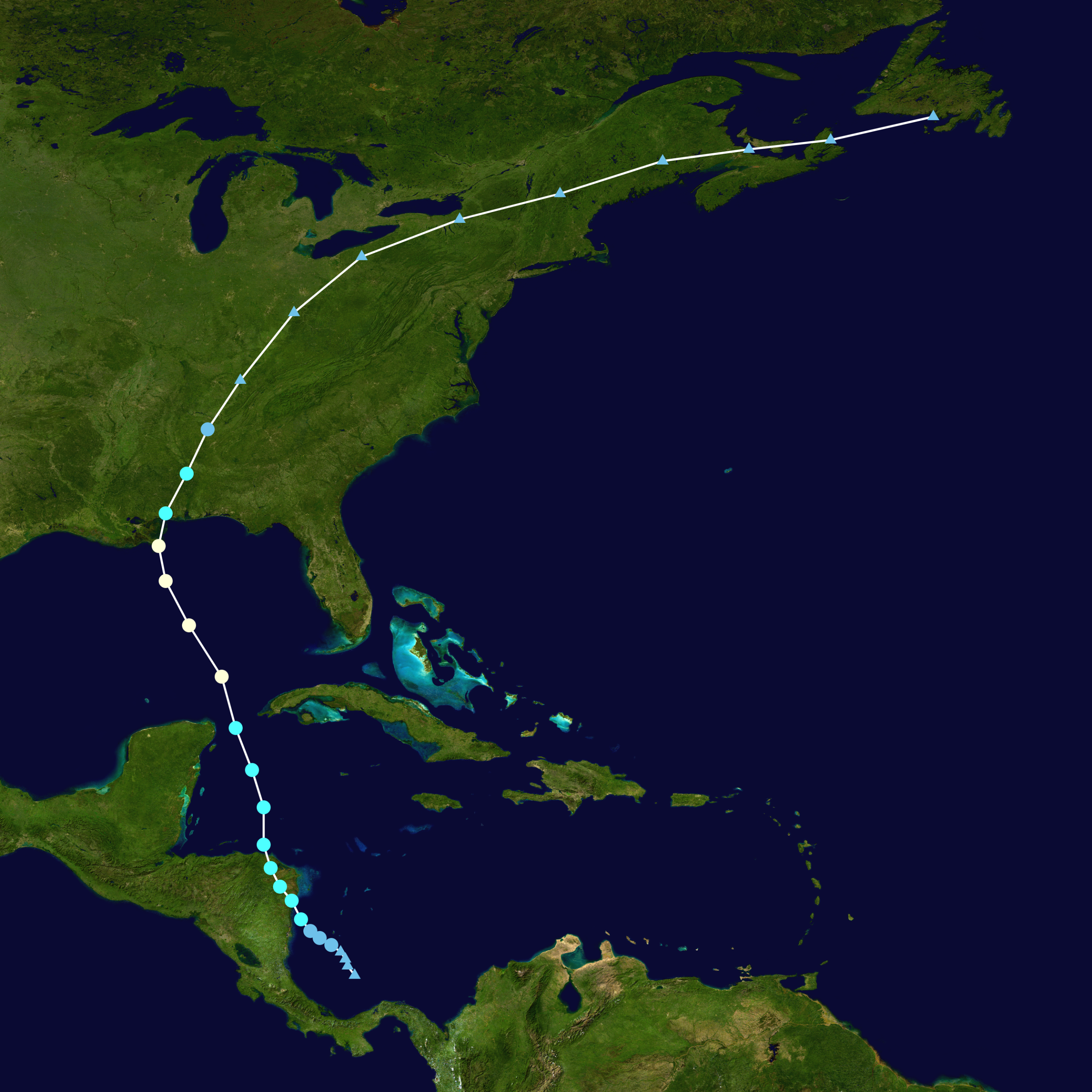
Map plotting the storm's track and intensity, according to the Saffir–Simpson scale Map key Saffir–Simpson scale Tropical depression (≤38 mph, ≤62 km/h) Tropical storm (39–73 mph, 63–118 km/h) Category 1 (74–95 mph, 119–153 km/h) Category 2 (96–110 mph, 154–177 km/h) Category 3 (111–129 mph, 178–208 km/h) Category 4 (130–156 mph, 209–251 km/h) Category 5 (≥157 mph, ≥252 km/h) Unknown Storm type Tropical cyclone Subtropical cyclone Extratropical cyclone, remnant low, tropical disturbance, or monsoon depression

An elongated surface trough of low pressure began interacting with an upper-level low across the northwestern Caribbean at the start of October, resulting in widespread cloudiness and scattered showers across the region. Despite unusually low surface pressures, strong upper-level winds were initially forecast to prevent significant organization. During the afternoon of October 3, satellite imagery and surface observations indicated that a broad area of low pressure had formed over the extreme southwestern Caribbean. The disturbance began to show signs of strengthening almost immediately; satellite images the next morning showed large curved bands of deep convection wrapping into the well-defined center, prompting the National Hurricane Center (NHC) to upgrade it to a tropical depression at 12:00 UTC on October 4, while located about 40 mi (64 km) south of San Andres Island.

The newly formed cyclone traveled on a northwest course during its incipience, steered by a ridge over the southwestern Atlantic. Later on October 4, the inner core convection blossomed, with a well-defined convective band on the eastern semicircle. The presence of a partial eyewall on the San Andres radar, coupled with surface observations from Nicaragua, incentivized the NHC to upgrade the depression to Tropical Storm Nate at 06:00 UTC on October 5. 6 hours later, the system had moved ashore just south of Puerto Cabezas. Combined with moderate southwesterly wind shear aloft, the storm's passage over the rugged terrains of Nicaragua and Honduras caused the cloud pattern to deteriorate, although its winds remained near tropical storm force. This lapse in structure was temporary, however, as Nate redeveloped deep convection even before re-emerging over water; in fact, the cyclone exhibited some semblance of a convective ring on microwave imagery. Embedded within a larger Central American Gyre across Central America, Nate maintained a northwesterly course across land, bringing the storm into the Gulf of Honduras during early October 6.

Infrared satellite loop of Nate making landfall in the Mississippi River Delta on October 8

Once over the warm waters of the northwestern Caribbean Sea, Nate began to strengthen slowly, despite its broad surface center and the disjointment of the maximum winds east from the center. A developing subtropical ridge over the western Atlantic turned the storm on a more north-northwest trajectory. NOAA and Air Force reserve reconnaissance aircraft sampling the system throughout the evening of October 6 confirmed continued intensification; data around 02:30 UTC the next day, showing a developing eyewall, supported upgrading Nate to the season's ninth consecutive hurricane. Continued flow between the ridge over the western Atlantic and the Central American gyre propelled Nate into the Yucatán Channel and then the Gulf of Mexico on October 7; in fact, with a 12-hour averaged motion of 29 mph (47 km/h), Nate became the fastest-moving hurricane on record in the gulf. Favorable environmental conditions allowed the strengthening to continue: Nate developed a symmetrical central dense overcast, featuring cloud tops cooler than −114 °F (−81 °C) and a sizable eye underneath, attaining peak winds of 90 mph (150 km/h) at 12:00 UTC. The hurricane reached a minimum barometric pressure of 981 mbar (hPa; 28.97 inHg) 6 hours later.

Impinging vertical wind shear caused Nate's convection to rapidly warm and lose structure, despite the storm's attempts to form a more distinct eye. Around 00:00 UTC on October 8, Nate made its second landfall near the mouth of the Mississippi River with winds of 85 mph (137 km/h). Deep convection migrated to the north and east of the center, and a curve toward the north brought the storm ashore for the final time near Biloxi, Mississippi at 05:30 UTC with winds of 75 mph (121 km/h). Inland, Nate became embedded within the fast mid-latitude westerlies, causing the storm to accelerate north-northeast while weakening to a tropical storm 30 minutes later. Surface observations indicated a rapidly weakening cyclone, prompting the NHC to downgrade Nate to a tropical depression at 12:00 UTC while it was located over southwestern Alabama; further advisories were relegated to the Weather Prediction Center (WPC). Nate continued to weaken, and degrading to a remnant low over Tennessee. A few hours later, the remnant low became an extratropical cyclone over the Ohio Valley. The extratropical cyclone moved northeastward into New England, then turned east-northeastward into Canadian Maritime on October 10. The extratropical remnant dissipated near Newfoundland on early October 11, as it degenerated into a trough rotating around another extratropical cyclone to its north.

== Preparations and impact ==
Deaths and damage by country
Country	Fatalities	Missing	Damage (2017 USD)	Ref
Costa Rica	14	0	$562 million	
Cuba	0	0	—N/a	
El Salvador	1	0	—N/a	
Guatemala	5	3	—N/a	
Honduras	3	3	—N/a	
Nicaragua	16	1	—N/a	
Panama	7	0	—N/a	
United States	2	0	$225 million	
Totals:	48	7	$787 million	

=== Central America ===
Coinciding with an unusually extreme rainy season as well as strong confluence of the Pacific and Atlantic trade winds, Nate and its precursor brought days of torrential rain to the already satured soils of Central America throughout the first week of October 2017. Emergency agencies and governments issued various weather alerts for their respective countries, with the Caribbean shores of Nicaragua and Honduras placed under a tropical storm warning when a strengthening Nate approached land. Schools and public offices were closed as storm shelters were prepared. In addition, Nate led to the cancellation of a FIFA World Cup qualification match between Costa Rica and Honduras scheduled for October 6 at Estadio Nacional in San José.

Still battling the preceding flooding, the entire region once again faced life-threatening situations as Nate's rains triggered mudslides and filled already rising rivers and streams to critical levels by October 5. Floods and mudslides were widespread, with Costa Rica and Nicaragua enduring the worst and deadliest impacts. As of October 11, the deluge had left 43 dead and nine missing across Central America, as well as causing serious structural damage.

==== Panama ====
During its formative stages, the precursor disturbance interacted with the monsoon trough to produce widespread cloudiness over Panama in the first week of October. Flooding rains fell over much of the Talamanca and Central mountain ranges, including the west-central provinces of Chiriquí, Ngäbe-Buglé, Veraguas, Panamá Oeste, Bocas del Toro, and Coclé, as well as Colón and Guna Yala along the Atlantic coast. On October 3, Panamanian officials issued an alert for heavy rain with strong gusts and urged residents on the riverbanks of Río de Jesús to evacuate. In Ngäbe-Buglé, a landslide killed six people. Squally rains downed trees, damaged roofs, and flooded homes throughout Veraguas and Chiriqui; in the latter province, 150 homes in Puerto Armuelles were affected, and two people required rescue from the cascading waters of a river in the San Lorenzo District. Trees fell onto roads and homes in Panamá Oeste, Panamá Este, San Miguelito and Herrera, causing light damage. A few landslides impacted the roads in those regions, leaving some impassable and obstructing an important traffic junction in Viguí. Blustery conditions associated with Nate affected 4,975 people throughout Panama and damaged or destroyed 84 houses. One person died in a shipwreck in Panama Bay.

==== Nicaragua ====
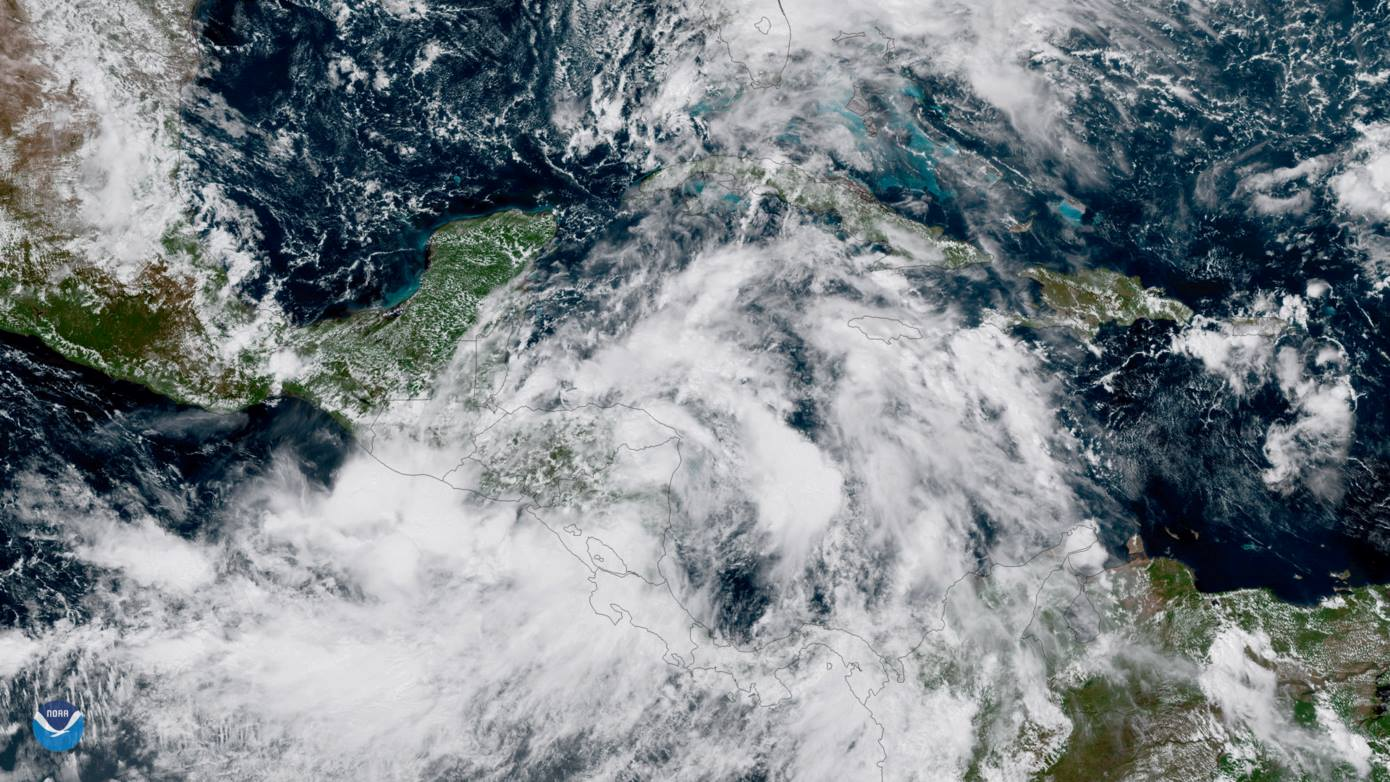
Tropical Storm Nate over Nicaragua on October 5

The Caribbean shores of Nicaragua were placed under alert as the precursor disturbance thrived, interacting with surrounding low pressures to produce widespread rainfall as early as October 3. Upon Nate's formation, a tropical storm warning was issued for the coast. Widespread flooding damaged or destroyed 5,953 homes, the vast majority in the Rivas Department, directly affecting approximately 29,000 people. At least 16 people died throughout Nicaragua while 1 other person was reported missing as of October 8. The term "Nate Effect" has been coined to describe a tropical cyclone in the Caribbean, that causes major damages on the Pacific side of the country.

==== Costa Rica ====
At the risk of flooding rains, Costa Rica's Central Valley, Pacific coast, and Huetar Norte region were placed under red alert for at least 3 days, starting on October 4, while a yellow alert was issued for the Caribbean coast. The greatest quantities, reaching 19.19 inches (487 mm), fell in Maritima; many other central Pacific locales, such as Quepos, recorded over 4.7 inches (120 mm) that day. In contrast, the capital of San José received no more than 1.4 inches (36 mm). In the canton of Oreamuno, Cartago Province, a bridge and part of a riverside house succumbed to the forces of a river, swollen from the initial rains on October 3. By October 5, the situation culminated: muddy waters surged through streets, neighborhoods, and even homes—some submerged to their roofs—as an increasing number of rivers burst their banks. About 800 residents living in risk zones had to be rescued, including 200 in Palmar Norte when the overflowing Térraba River swept away houses and belongings. The storm cut off drinking water to nearly 500,000 people, and left 18,500 without power. Torrents, landslides, and fallen trees—particularly in the provinces of Cartago, Puntarenas, Guanacaste, Alajuela, and San José—claimed the lives of 14 people, and forced 11,300 into 170 shelters across Costa Rica. The flooding was the worst to hit the country in recent years, leading to the "biggest crisis in Costa Rican history" according to President Luis Guillermo Solís. In response, Solís declared a state of emergency for the entire country on October 6, as well as a national day of mourning.

The country's infrastructure, especially the road networks in southern regions, sustained tremendous damage from expansive flooding, landslides and subsidence; 117 roads throughout all provinces but Limón were affected in some way or form, 40 of which were rendered impassable. Spanning 413 mi (665 km) through Costa Rica, the Inter-American Highway suffered various degrees of damage at 112 different sites, ranging from superficial cracks and potholes, to total structural failures. At least 42 bridges collapsed, many waterways and drainage systems were overwhelmed, and a number of routes were practically "wiped out", isolating villages and leading to widespread disruptions in the transport sector. Many petrospheres at the World Heritage archaeological site of Palmar Sur were covered with up to 12 inches (30 cm) of mud. The infrastructural costs across the country exceeded ₡10 billion (US$17.5 million), with repairs expected to take years. With over 306,000 acres (124,000 hectares) of arable land damaged, the agricultural sector reported significant losses. Among the hardest hit crops were sugarcane, vegetables, grains, melons and papayas, especially in the Guanacaste, Puntarenas and Central Valley regions. In Guanacaste, the storm converted pastures and sugarcane fields into ponds and washed out 3,200 acres (1,300 hectares) of rice. Material damage from Nate across Costa Rica is estimated at ₡106 billion (US$185 million). Total damage caused by the hurricane in Costa Rica was estimated at ₡309 billion (US$562 million), making it the costliest natural disaster in Costa Rican history.

==== Rest of Central America ====
Rainbow infrared satellite loop of Nate passing the Yucatán Channel on October 6

At least three people were killed and three others were reported missing across Honduras, including one in Tierra Blanca. One person was also killed in El Salvador.

=== Cuba ===
Heavy rains and strong winds impacted portions of western Cuba, particularly Pinar del Río Province. Rainfall reached 4.04 in (102.7 mm) in San Juan y Martínez, bringing local reservoirs to near-capacity. Some flooding affected homes in the province, but overall damage was limited. Winds up to 56 mph (90 km/h) disrupted electrical service in Cabo San Antonio.

=== United States ===
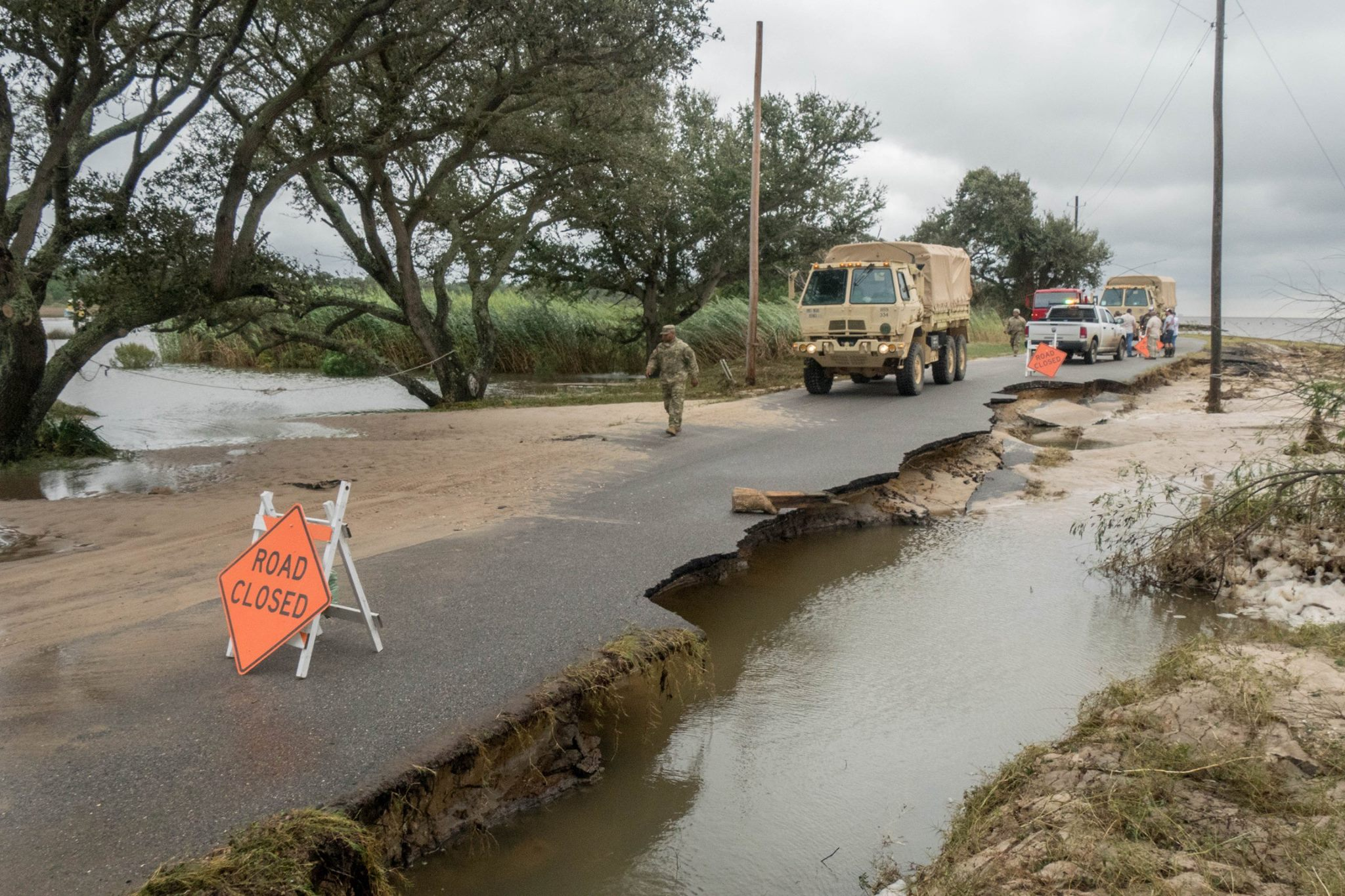
A washed out road in Jackson County, Mississippi.

The local officials in Louisiana, Florida, Alabama, and Mississippi declared states of emergency or also evacuation orders. In preparation for Nate, officials in Grand Isle, Louisiana, declared a voluntary evacuation. New Orleans Mayor Mitch Landrieu met with local, state, and federal officials to discuss preparation measures as the city continued to experience critical deficiencies in its drainage system from two months prior. Florida Governor Rick Scott declared a state of emergency for 29 counties in the northern portion of the state. Offshore, oil and gas companies began evacuating production platforms in the Gulf of Mexico. Six platforms had been cleared by midday on October 5, and a movable rig was moved out of the storm's path. Aircraft of the Air Force Reserve Command's 403d Wing were evacuated from Keesler Air Force Base, Mississippi, as a precautionary measure. The military also prepared the amphibious assault ship Iwo Jima and transport dock New York to assist with search-and-rescue and recovery effort.

Rain-slicked roads may have been a factor in a fatal accident along I-24 in Tennessee. A firefighter was struck and killed by a car while cleaning up storm debris in Morganton, North Carolina. Nate spawned 21 tornadoes, incluing two EF2 tornadoes in South Carolina. Total damage reached $22.3 million, primarily in southwestern Alabama.

== Record and retirement ==
On October 7, the National Weather Service stated that Hurricane Nate had broken the record for the fastest forward motion by a hurricane in the Gulf of Mexico, with a speed of 29 miles per hour (47 km/h). This top forward motion occurred during a 12-hour period on Saturday, October 7, as Nate sped northward towards the Gulf Coast.

Because of the storm's significant impacts in Costa Rica, the World Meteorological Organization retired the name Nate from its rotating lists of names in April 2018, and it will never again be used for another Atlantic hurricane. It was replaced with Nigel for the 2023 season.

== See also ==
- Weather of 2017
- Tropical cyclones in 2017
- Timeline of the 2017 Atlantic hurricane season
- List of Category 1 Atlantic hurricanes
- 1916 Gulf Coast hurricane – A destructive Category 3 hurricane that took a similar, albeit slower, path to Nate's
- Hurricane Gert (1993) – Produced widespread flooding through Central America before striking Mexico as a Category 2 hurricane
- Tropical Storm Arlene (2005) – An early-season, near hurricane strength storm that impacted similar areas
- Hurricane Ida (2009) – A Category 2 hurricane that took a similar path to Nate's
- Hurricane Richard (2010) – A Category 2 hurricane that took a similar path over the Yucatán Peninsula, causing landslides
- Hurricane Otto (2016) – A Category 3 hurricane that produced similarly severe effects in Nicaragua, Costa Rica, and Panama
- Hurricane Eta (2020) – A disastrous Category 4 hurricane that bought widespread damage to Central America
- Tropical Storm Alberto (2018) – A pre-season storm that followed a similar path
- Hurricane Michael (2018) – Another tropical cyclone that spawned near Central America and tracked northwards before making landfall on the Florida Panhandle as a Category 5 hurricane
