= Penny war =

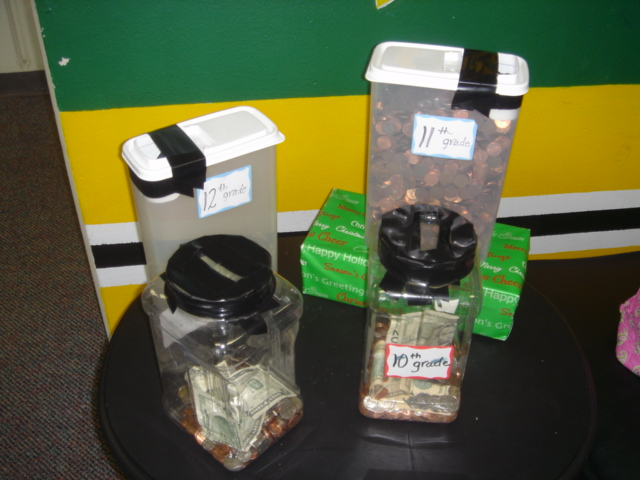
Funds raised by rival groups during a penny war

A penny war is a fundraising competition where two or more groups collect coins and bills in an effort to score points based on the amount and denomination collected.

Each group has a bucket for collecting the money; typically groups collect coins, but dollar bills may also be accepted. The value of any pennies collected by a group count toward that group's point total, while the value of other coins or dollar bills are subtracted. Hence, in a competition between Group A and Group B, a contributor who wants Group A to win will place pennies into Group A's bucket and nickels, dimes, quarters, or dollar bills into Group B's bucket.

At the end, a winner among the groups is declared, sometimes earning a small prize or an event such a pizza party or ice cream party. The proceeds are donated to a specified charity or cause.

Given the 2025 discontinuation of the United States penny, it remains unlikely that penny wars will stay, or may continue under new rules.
