= Hurricane Carlos (2015) =

Category 1 Pacific hurricane in 2015

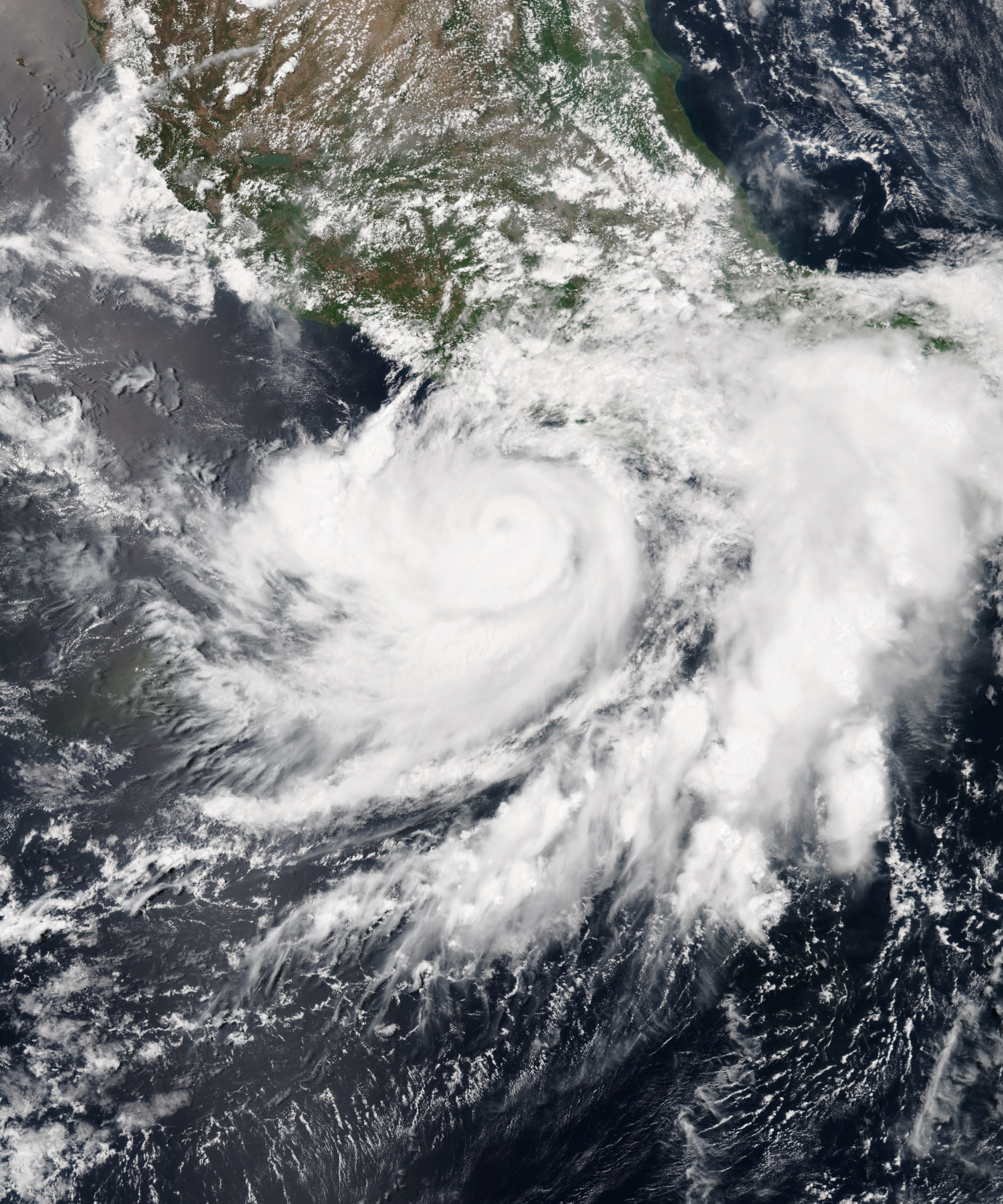
- Carlos near its initial peak intensity on June 13

Meteorological history
- Formed: June 10, 2015
- Remnant low: June 17, 2015
- Dissipated: June 18, 2015

Category 1 hurricane
- 1-minute sustained (SSHWS/NWS)
- Highest winds: 90 mph (150 km/h)
- Lowest pressure: 978 mbar (hPa); 28.88 inHg

Overall effects
- Fatalities: None
- Damage: $1.4 million (2015 USD)
- Areas affected: Southwestern and Western Mexico
- IBTrACS /
- Part of the 2015 Pacific hurricane season

Hurricane Carlos was an unusually small tropical cyclone which affected the western coast of Mexico in June 2015. Forming as the third named storm and hurricane of the annual hurricane season, Carlos developed from a trough first noted by the National Hurricane Center on June 7. The disturbance gradually organized and was designated as a tropical depression three days later while south of the Mexican Pacific coast. Drifting slowly northwestward, the depression was upgraded further to a tropical storm. Although persistent wind shear and dry air hampered intensification early on, Carlos strengthened into a hurricane on June 13 after moving into a more favorable environment. However, the return of dry air and upwelling of cooler waters caused the system to deteriorate into a tropical storm. Paralleling the Mexican coast, Carlos later regained hurricane intensity on June 15 and attained peak winds of 90 mph (140 km/h) a day later. The reprieve was brief, however, as the onset of wind shear, land interaction, and dry air afterward led to rapid weakening. On June 17, Carlos degenerated into a remnant area of low pressure, having made landfall in Jalisco earlier that day. By the morning of June 18, Carlos was declared to have completely dissipated.

Carlos's close track to Mexico prompted coastal authorities to enact precautionary measures along states deemed at risk, including the issuance of tropical cyclone warnings and watches over a large swath of the coast, extending from Acapulco to Cabo Corrientes. In Guerrero, more than 500 shelters were opened, and schools in most of the state were closed. Rough seas along the shore generated by the hurricane caused widespread damage, which included the sinking of 12 ships in Playa Manzanillo harbor. The waves combined with heavy rain to inflict at least MXN$5 million (US$326,000) of damage on Michoacán's coastal installations. Strong winds produced by the passing storm also downed trees, power poles, and billboards along much of the western Mexican coast. In Jalisco, classes were also suspended in anticipation of heavy rains, however, damage in the state was relatively minor. Overall, Carlos caused roughly MXN$16 million (US$1.04 million) worth of damage across Mexico.

== Meteorological history ==
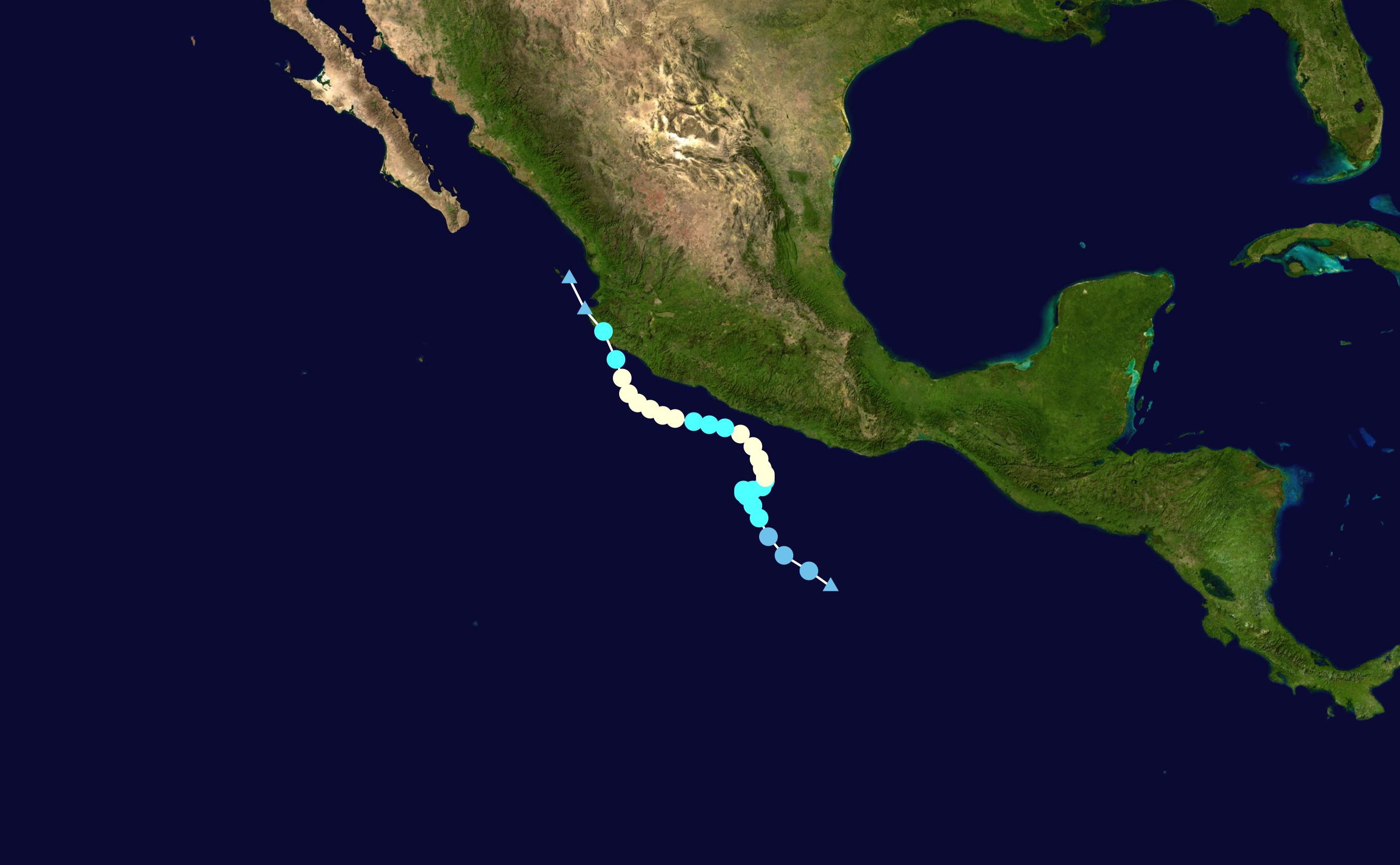
Map plotting the storm's track and intensity, according to the Saffir–Simpson scale Map key Saffir–Simpson scale Tropical depression (≤38 mph, ≤62 km/h) Tropical storm (39–73 mph, 63–118 km/h) Category 1 (74–95 mph, 119–153 km/h) Category 2 (96–110 mph, 154–177 km/h) Category 3 (111–129 mph, 178–208 km/h) Category 4 (130–156 mph, 209–251 km/h) Category 5 (≥157 mph, ≥252 km/h) Unknown Storm type Tropical cyclone Subtropical cyclone Extratropical cyclone, remnant low, tropical disturbance, or monsoon depression

Late on June 2, the National Hurricane Center (NHC) highlighted the potential for an area of low pressure to form well south of the coasts of Guatemala and El Salvador over subsequent days. This forecast came to fruition early on June 7, when shower and thunderstorm activity began to increase in association with a trough south of the Gulf of Tehuantepec. Steered steadily northwestward by a subtropical ridge, the disturbance acquired organized, deep convection near the center, prompting the NHC to upgrade it to a tropical depression at 18:00 UTC on June 10. Following the formation of a spiral band that wrapped more than halfway around the center, the depression was upgraded to Tropical Storm Carlos at 12:00 UTC the following day while positioned about 230 miles (370 km) south of Acapulco, Mexico.

Following its designation as a named storm, Carlos drifted generally north-northwestward while embedded within a weak steering regime. The cyclone struggled with a combination of northerly wind shear and dry air entrainment, limiting the storm's associated deep convection to the eastern quadrant. By early on June 13, however, a ragged eye became evident on visible satellite imagery as the upper-level environment became increasingly conducive for intensification, and Carlos was upgraded to a Category 1 hurricane on the Saffir–Simpson scale at 12:00 UTC. Deep convection became increasingly symmetric about the eye, and the cyclone reached its initial peak intensity six hours later with winds of 85 mph (137 km/h) and a minimum pressure of 978 mbar (hPa; 28.88 inHg). However, early on June 14, the presentation of Carlos began to deteriorate as a result of upwelling and the ingestion of dry air; the eye became obscured and banding features decreased as evident on satellite imagery, while the eyewall became increasingly ill-defined on radar. At 00:00 UTC on June 15, the storm was downgraded to a tropical storm about 75 mi (121 km) west-southwest of Acapulco.

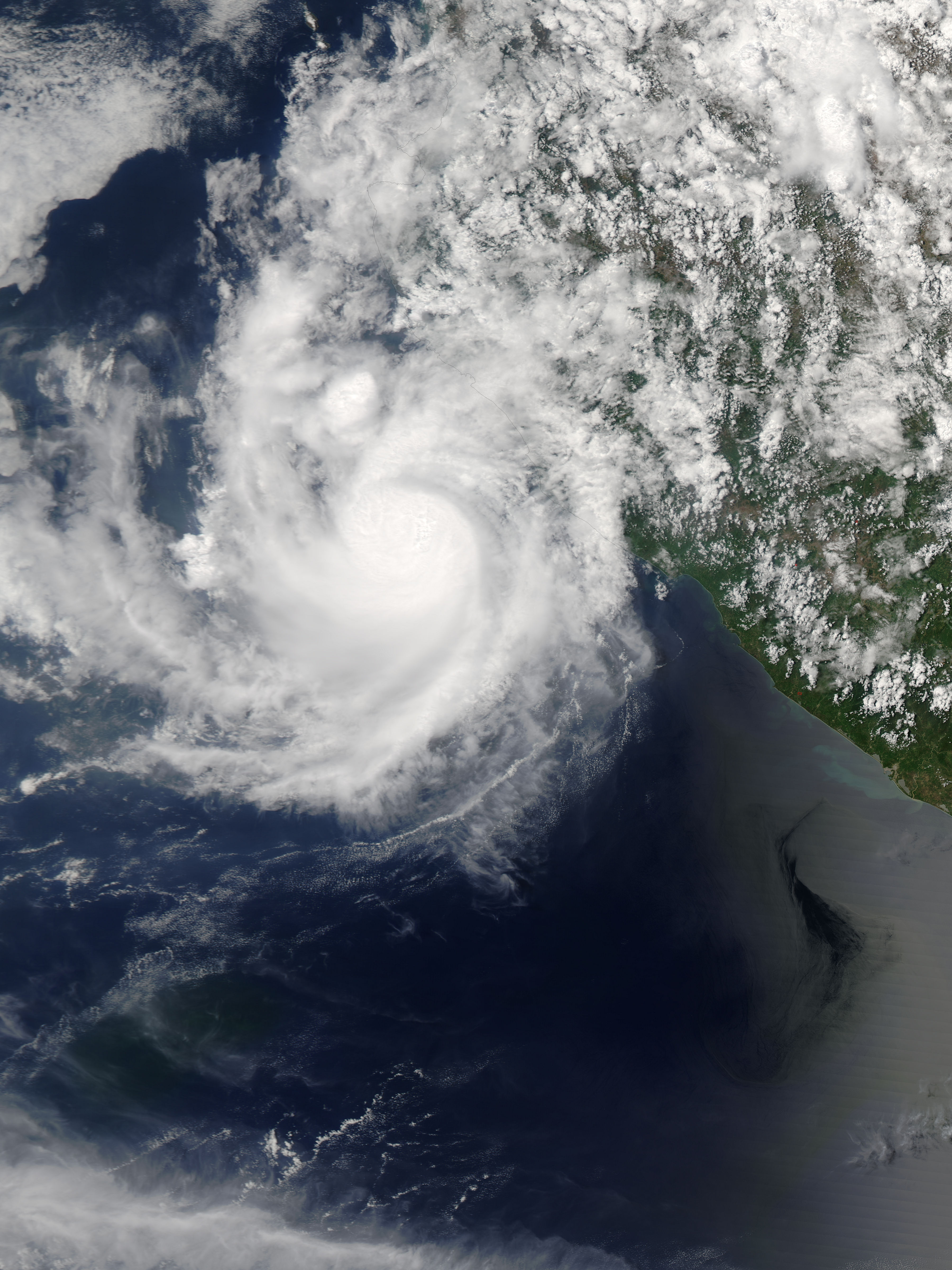
Hurricane Carlos brushing the Mexican coast on June 16

Over the next 24 hours, Carlos changed little in structure as it tracked to the west-northwest under the influence of a mid-level ridge across central Mexico. However, a microwave pass early on June 15 indicated the presence of a small, closed eye, and an Air Force Reserve reconnaissance aircraft investigating the system a few hours later recorded peak 700 mb flight-level winds of 79 mph (127 km/h) and surface winds in the range of 74–77 mph (119–124 km/h). As a result, Carlos was once again upgraded to a Category 1 hurricane. Despite persistent northerly wind shear, the presentation continued to improve throughout the morning hours of June 16, with deep convection near the center and a banding eye feature observable. Concurrent with this period of intensification, Carlos's radius of maximum wind decreased to around 6 mi (9.7 km), a feature noted as "very unusual" by the NHC. A second reconnaissance mission into the storm around 18:00 UTC that day found that the storm had attained winds of 90 mph (140 km/h), despite the minimum pressure only reaching a low of 984 mbar (hPa; 29.06 inHg). Over the next few hours, Carlos quickly weakened as the environment became unfavorable. At 09:00 UTC on June 17, the storm made landfall near Tenacatita, Jalisco, with winds of 50 mph (80 km/h). By that evening, Carlos had degraded into a depression, and not long after Carlos was declared a remnant low. The remaining vortex later moved back over water as it accelerated to the northwest, and dissipated near the Islas Marías before 06:00 UTC on June 18.

== Preparations and impact ==
Shortly after Carlos's designation, authorities in Guerrero suspended classes for five municipalities. Statewide, 507 shelters were opened, including 98 in Acapulco. The ports of Acapulco and Zihuatanejo were closed for navigation on June 13 and swimming in the ocean was banned in the former. Simultaneously, a tropical storm watch was issued for Acapulco to Punta San Telmo. After Carlos became a hurricane, officials activated a red alert in southwestern Guerrero, while a yellow alert was declared for Michoacan and the rest of Guerrero. Seven other states were placed under lower levels of alert. At 21:00 UTC on June 13, the tropical storm watch was upgraded to a warning, and a hurricane warning was issued from Tecpán de Galeana to Lázaro Cárdenas. On June 15, despite Carlos weakening to a tropical storm, the remainder of Guerrero was placed on an orange alert. On the afternoon of June 15, the hurricane warning was discontinued, but a hurricane watch remained in effect from Punta San Telmo to Playa Perula. Later, as Carlos restrengthened to a hurricane, the orange alert was relocated to most of Colima, southern Michoacán and western Guerrero, while the yellow alert was moved to cover the rest of the three aforementioned states. The tropical storm warning was extended to cover up to Cabo Corrientes, however, the warnings south of Manzanillo were discontinued at 18:00 UTC on June 17. Classes in six municipalities of Jalisco were suspended by the authorities. Eventually, the remaining warnings and watches, were discontinued as Carlos weakened and later dissipated.

Strong winds downed several trees and power poles in coastal Guerrero. High waves caused localized flooding in tourist areas, leaving three automobiles trapped in Acapulco. Within the city itself, 17 trees and three billboards were toppled and some locations lost power. A total of 16 homes were washed away. One person was injured when a wall collapsed. At the Playa Manzanillo harbor, 37 ships were damaged, of which 12 sunk. The Bellissima, a luxury yacht reportedly worth MXN$11 million (US$717,000) owned by businessman and politician Jorge Kahwagi, was among the vessels sunk by the storm. Large waves up to 4.5 m (15 ft) high and heavy rain caused at least MXN$5 million (US$326,000) in damage to coastal installations across Michoacán. Farther north in Guadalajara, Jalisco, Carlos was thought to have caused one death when a person was fatally injured by falling metal. However, the NHC later determined that the death was caused by severe weather unrelated to Carlos.

== See also ==
- Weather of 2015
- Tropical cyclones in 2015
- List of Category 1 Pacific hurricanes
- Other tropical cyclones named Carlos
- Hurricane Andres (2009)
- Hurricane Beatriz (2011)
- Hurricane Erick (2013)
