= List of storms named Beatriz =

The name Beatriz has been used for eight tropical cyclones in the Eastern Pacific Ocean.

- Hurricane Beatriz (1981) – a Category 1 hurricane that remained far from land
- Tropical Storm Beatriz (1987) – a tropical storm that formed far from land
- Tropical Storm Beatriz (1993) – a tropical storm that made landfall in Mexico, leaving six fatalities
- Hurricane Beatriz (1999) – a Category 3 hurricane that didn't affect land
- Tropical Storm Beatriz (2005) – a tropical storm that never threatened land
- Hurricane Beatriz (2011) – a Category 1 hurricane that grazed Mexico, causing four fatalities
- Tropical Storm Beatriz (2017) – made landfall in Mexico, causing seven fatalities
- Hurricane Beatriz (2023) – a Category 1 hurricane brushed southwestern Mexico, causing one fatality
