= List of storms named Carlos =

The name Carlos has been used for ten tropical cyclones worldwide: eight in the East Pacific Ocean, one in the Australian region, and one in the South-West Indian Ocean.

In the East Pacific:

- Tropical Storm Carlos (1979) – a fast-moving tropical storm that did not make landfall
- Tropical Storm Carlos (1985) – a short-lived and minimal tropical storm which did not affect land
- Hurricane Carlos (1991) – early-season major hurricane that remained in the open ocean
- Tropical Storm Carlos (1997) – a moderate but also short-lived tropical storm which never threatened land and caused no reported casualties or damage
- Tropical Storm Carlos (2003) – a fairly strong tropical storm that impacted Mexico, causing nine fatalities and a monetary damage total of 86.7 million pesos ($8 million 2003 USD)
- Hurricane Carlos (2009) – a Category 2 hurricane which affected no land areas
- Hurricane Carlos (2015) – a small tropical cyclone which caused moderate impacts to the southern and western coasts of Mexico
- Tropical Storm Carlos (2021) – another short-lived, early-season tropical cyclone that stayed at sea

In the Australian region:

- Cyclone Carlos (2011) – a relatively strong cyclone which produced a record three-day total of 684.8 mm (26.96 in) rain, recorded at Darwin International Airport

In the South-West Indian:

- Cyclone Carlos (2017) – a moderately strong tropical cyclone which passed near the Mascarene Islands

== See also ==
- Typhoon Carlo (1996) – a Pacific typhoon with a similar name
