= Tropical Storm Carlos (2003) =

Pacific tropical storm in 2003

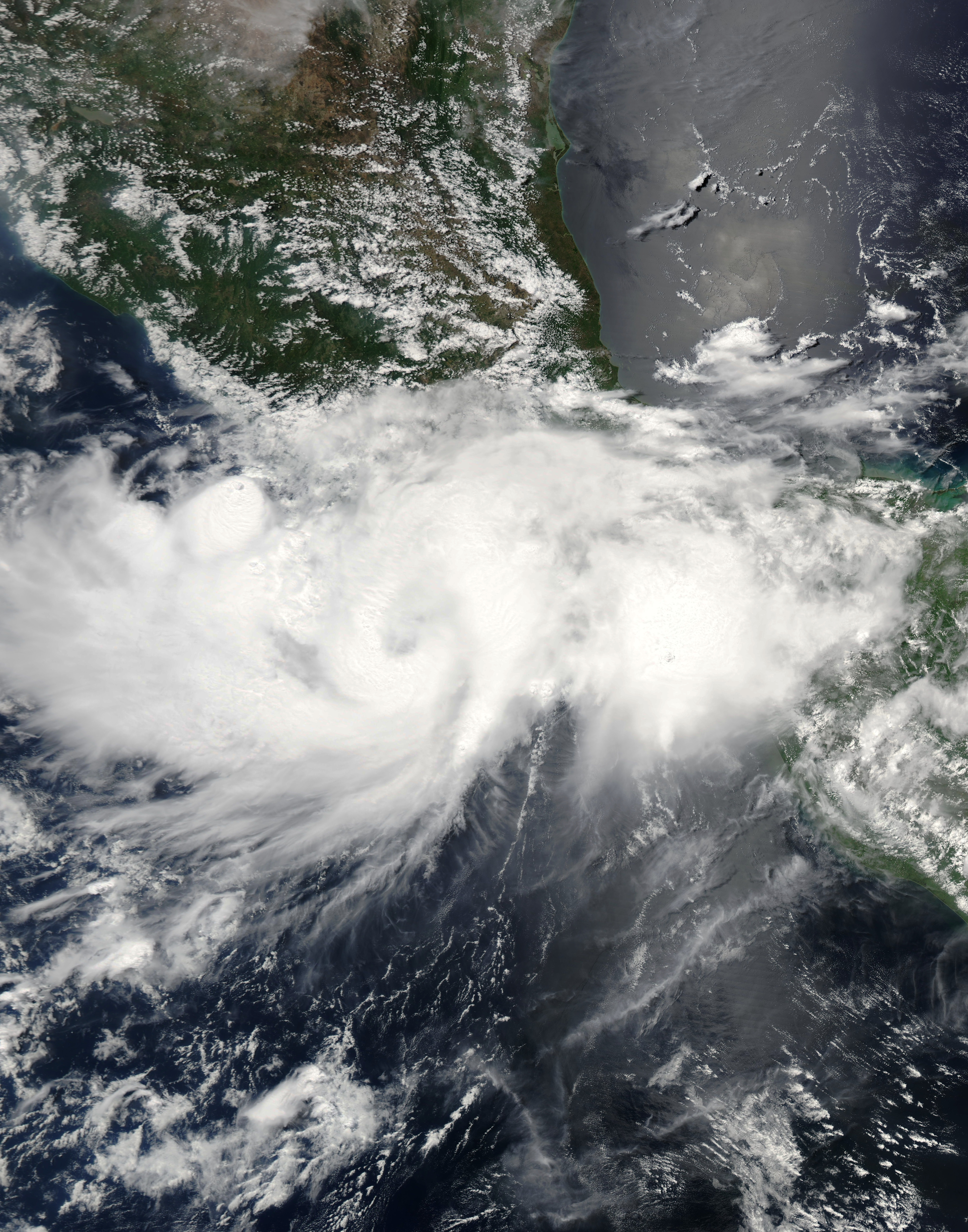
- Tropical Storm Carlos near peak intensity on June 26

Meteorological history
- Formed: June 26, 2003
- Dissipated: June 27, 2003

Tropical storm
- 1-minute sustained (SSHWS/NWS)
- Highest winds: 65 mph (100 km/h)
- Lowest pressure: 996 mbar (hPa); 29.41 inHg

Overall effects
- Fatalities: 9 total, 2 missing
- Damage: $8 million (2003 USD)
- Areas affected: Southwestern Mexico
- IBTrACS
- Part of the 2003 Pacific hurricane season

Tropical Storm Carlos was the first of five tropical cyclones to make landfall during the 2003 Pacific hurricane season. It formed on June 26 from a tropical wave to the south of Mexico. It quickly strengthened as it approached the coast, and early on June 27 Carlos moved ashore in Oaxaca with winds of 65 mph (105 km/h). The storm rapidly deteriorated to a remnant low, which persisted until dissipating on June 29. Carlos brought heavy rainfall to portions of southern Mexico, peaking at 337 mm (13.3 in) in two locations in Guerrero. Throughout its path, the storm damaged about 30,000 houses, with a monetary damage total of 86.7 million pesos (2003 MXN, $8 million 2003 USD). At least nine people were killed throughout the country, seven due to mudslides and two from river flooding; there was also a report of two missing fishermen.

== Meteorological history ==
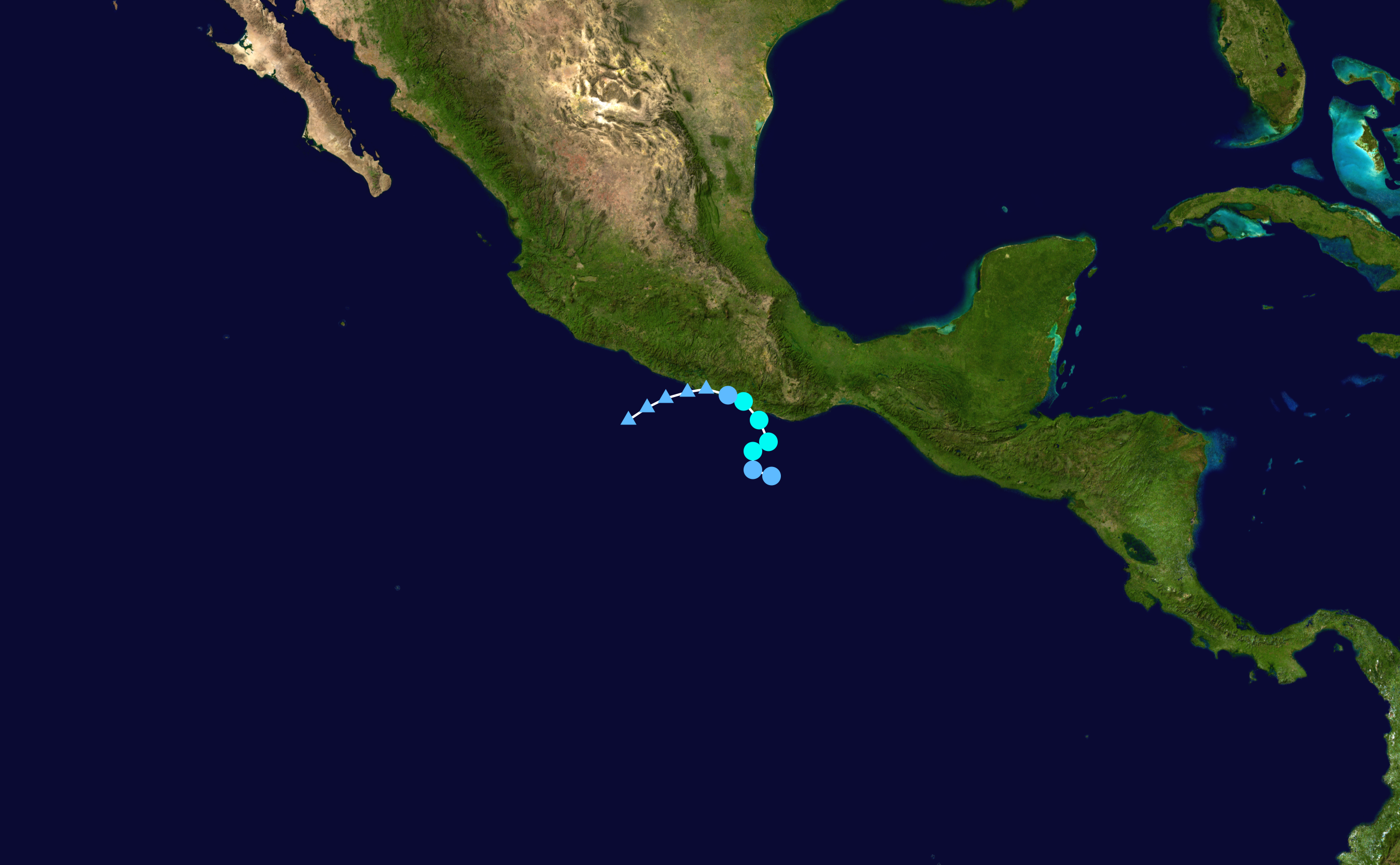
Map plotting the storm's track and intensity, according to the Saffir–Simpson scale Map key Saffir–Simpson scale Tropical depression (≤38 mph, ≤62 km/h) Tropical storm (39–73 mph, 63–118 km/h) Category 1 (74–95 mph, 119–153 km/h) Category 2 (96–110 mph, 154–177 km/h) Category 3 (111–129 mph, 178–208 km/h) Category 4 (130–156 mph, 209–251 km/h) Category 5 (≥157 mph, ≥252 km/h) Unknown Storm type Tropical cyclone Subtropical cyclone Extratropical cyclone, remnant low, tropical disturbance, or monsoon depression

The origins of Carlos were from a tropical wave that exited the west coast of Africa on June 14. The wave moved westward across the Atlantic Ocean and Caribbean Sea, with little evidence of its existence on satellite imagery. By June 20 it crossed Central America into the eastern Pacific Ocean, later spawning an area of convection, or thunderstorms, south of the Gulf of Tehuantepec. The National Hurricane Center (NHC) first mentioned the system in its tropical weather outlook on June 24, by which time a low pressure center developed. Gradually, the system continued to develop due to light wind shear, with rainbands and convection located near the broad center. By early on June 26, the disturbance had organized enough for the NHC to initiate advisories on Tropical Depression Three-E, about 130 miles (210 km) south-southwest of Puerto Escondido, Oaxaca.

Upon first being classified as a tropical cyclone, the depression had a slightly elongated circulation. An anticyclone to its north was forecast to track westward, which would allow the depression to track west-northwestward and remain offshore; however, the NHC noted uncertainty in its motion. The cloud pattern gradually organized, with warm water temperatures and lessening wind shear. At 1200 UTC on June 26, it is estimated the depression attained tropical storm status; upon doing so, the NHC named the storm Carlos. As it reached tropical storm intensity, Carlos began an erratic northward track toward the Mexican coast, under the influence of a trough. It quickly strengthened, developing a well-defined eye feature in the center of the convection. Based on the eye, it is estimated Carlos made landfall early on June 27 with peak winds of 65 mph (105 km/h), about 60 miles (97 km) west of Puerto Escondido, Oaxaca, or about 150 miles (240 km)/h) east-southeast of Acapulco, Guerrero.

As Carlos moved inland, it turned to the northwest in response to the anticyclone over Mexico, and it quickly weakened to tropical depression status. By 12 hours after landfall, there was little evidence of a circulation on satellite imagery. Late on June 27, Carlos degenerated into a non-convective remnant low pressure area near Acapulco. The circulation turned to the southwest and emerged into the Pacific Ocean; by 0000 UTC on June 29, the system dissipated completely.

== Preparations and impact ==
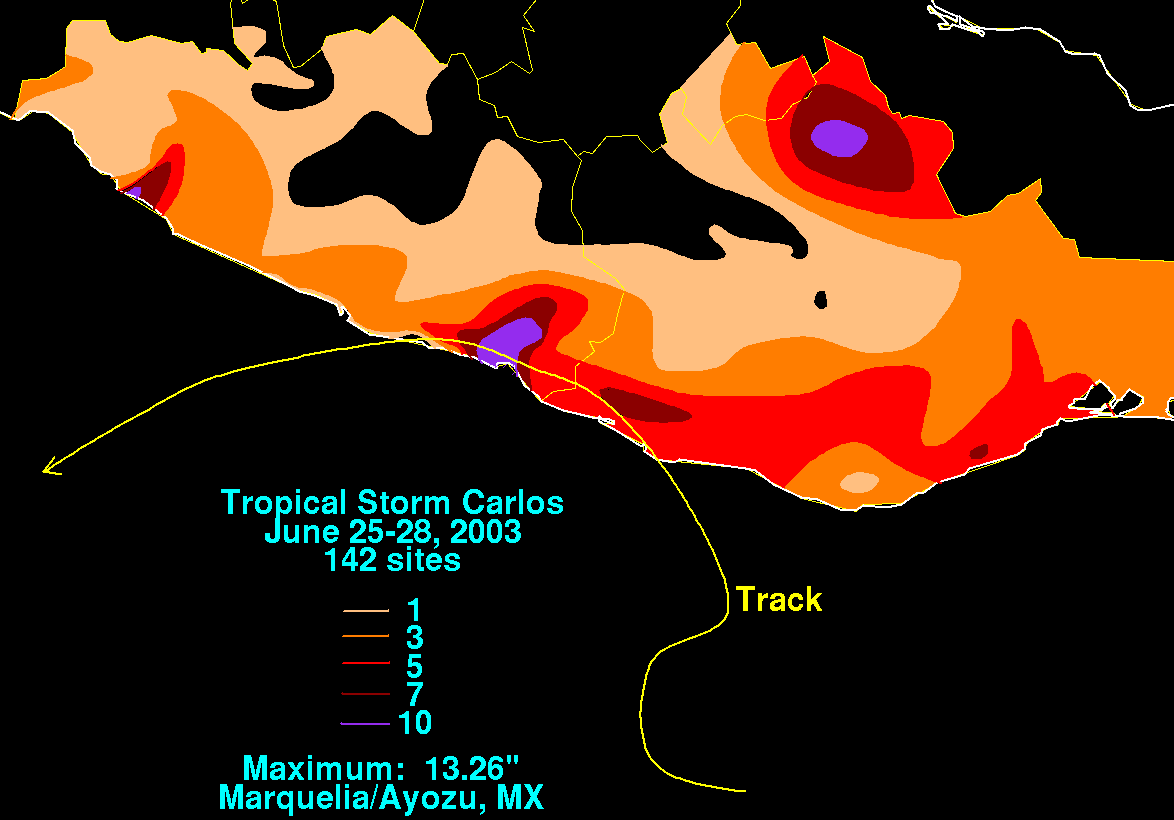
Rainfall summary for Tropical Storm Carlos

When the cyclone first formed, the Government of Mexico issued a tropical storm warning from Acapulco, Guerrero to Punta San Telmo, Michoacán, although initially it was forecast to remain offshore. After Carlos attained tropical storm status and when it was correctly anticipated to make landfall, the warning area was adjusted from Salina Cruz, Oaxaca to Zihuatanejo, Guerrero. Although the storm moved ashore in Oaxaca, its rainbands also affected the Mexican states of Chiapas, Tabasco, Veracruz, Puebla, and Guerrero. On the day when Carlos made landfall, it dropped heavy rainfall, with 24‑hour statewide maxima of 254 mm (10.0 in) in Río Verde, Oaxaca, and 112 mm (4.4 in) in Petatlán, Guerrero. Throughout the country, rainfall peaked at 337 mm (13.3 in) in both Marquelia and Azoyú in Guerrero.

Tropical Storm Carlos affected 79 municipalities in Oaxaca with flooding or rainfall, and much of the region was declared a disaster area; as a result, disaster funds were opened. Across the region, the combination of rainfall and strong winds downed power lines, disrupted phone service, and flooded two major highways; additionally, the storm left widespread damage to other roads and airstrips. In northwestern Oaxaca, seven people were killed when the heavy rainfall triggered a mudslide. Mudslides were reported elsewhere in the state, and about 30,000 homes were damaged. In one town, the flooding forced 150 families to evacuate to shelters. In Guerrero, a flooded river killed two people. Four fishermen were reported missing, possibly swept out to sea due to the storm; the Mexican army searched offshore for several days, rescuing two of the four fishermen by four days after the storm. Overall, the storm affected about 148,000 people, 10 ha (25 acres) of crops were destroyed, and monetary damage totaled 86.7 million pesos (2003 MXN, $8 million 2003 USD), a third of which was property.

== See also ==
- Tropical cyclones in 2003
- Weather of 2003
- Other tropical cyclones named Carlos
