= Tropical Storm Beatriz (2017) =

Pacific tropical storm in 2017

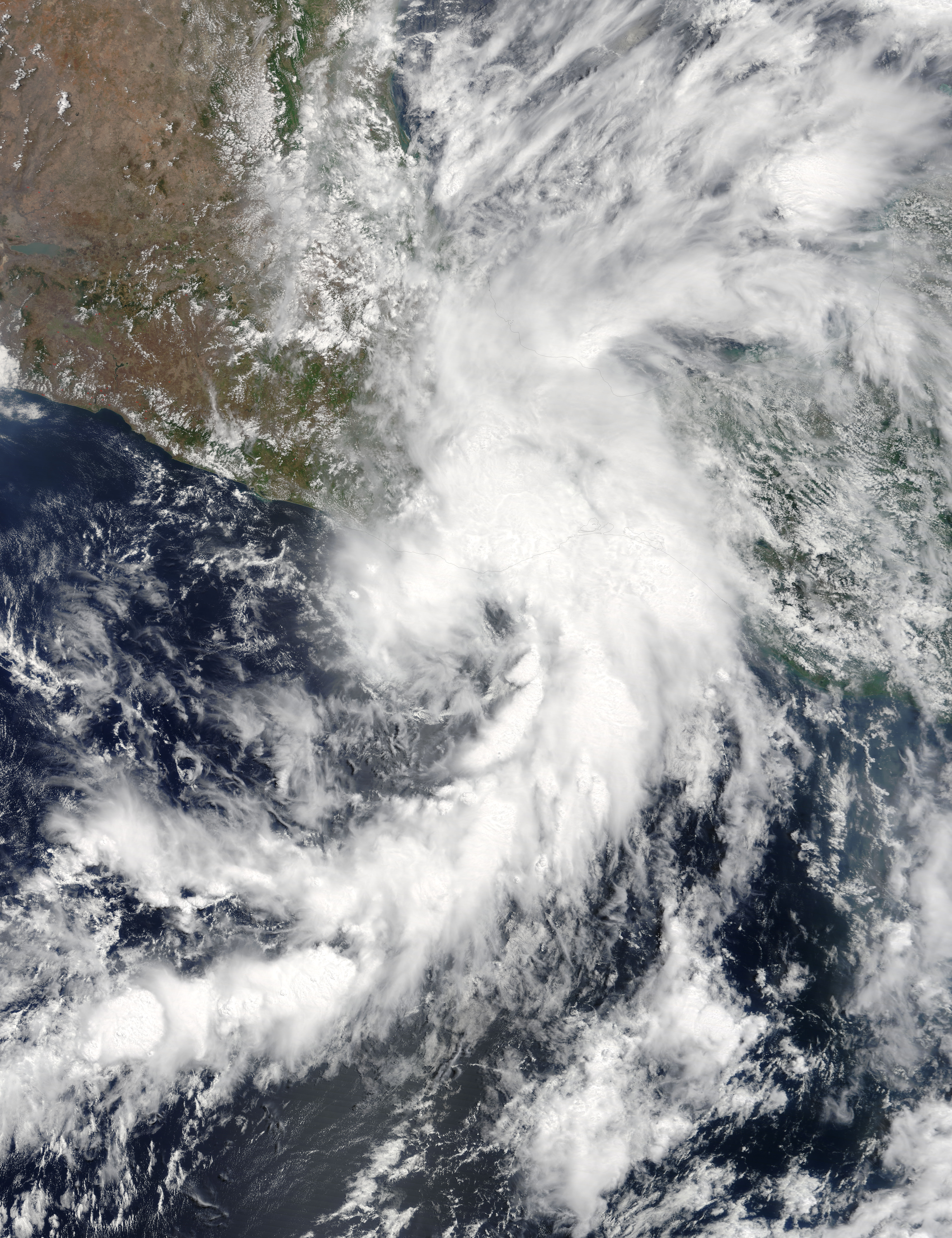
- Tropical Storm Beatriz at peak intensity off the coast of Oaxaca on June 1.

Meteorological history
- Formed: May 31, 2017
- Dissipated: June 2, 2017

Tropical storm
- 1-minute sustained (SSHWS/NWS)
- Highest winds: 45 mph (75 km/h)
- Lowest pressure: 1001 mbar (hPa); 29.56 inHg

Overall effects
- Fatalities: 7 total
- Damage: $172 million (2017 USD)
- Areas affected: Southwestern Mexico
- IBTrACS /
- Part of the 2017 Pacific hurricane season

Tropical Storm Beatriz was a short-lived tropical storm that made landfall in the Mexican state of Oaxaca in June 2017. The second named storm of the 2017 Pacific hurricane season, Beatriz developed from a tropical wave which had exited the coast of West Africa on May 18 and crossed Central America, and was designated as Tropical Depression Two-E on May 31. Shortly after being upgraded to a tropical storm, Beatriz made landfall near Puerto Angel, Mexico on the evening of June 1. It subsequently weakened into a tropical depression as it moved ashore, dissipating quickly afterwards.

Heavy rainfall from Beatriz caused flash flooding and mudslides in portions of Southwestern Mexico, resulting in seven fatalities. Along its path, Beatriz caused MXN$3.2 billion (US$172 million) in damage.

== Meteorological history ==
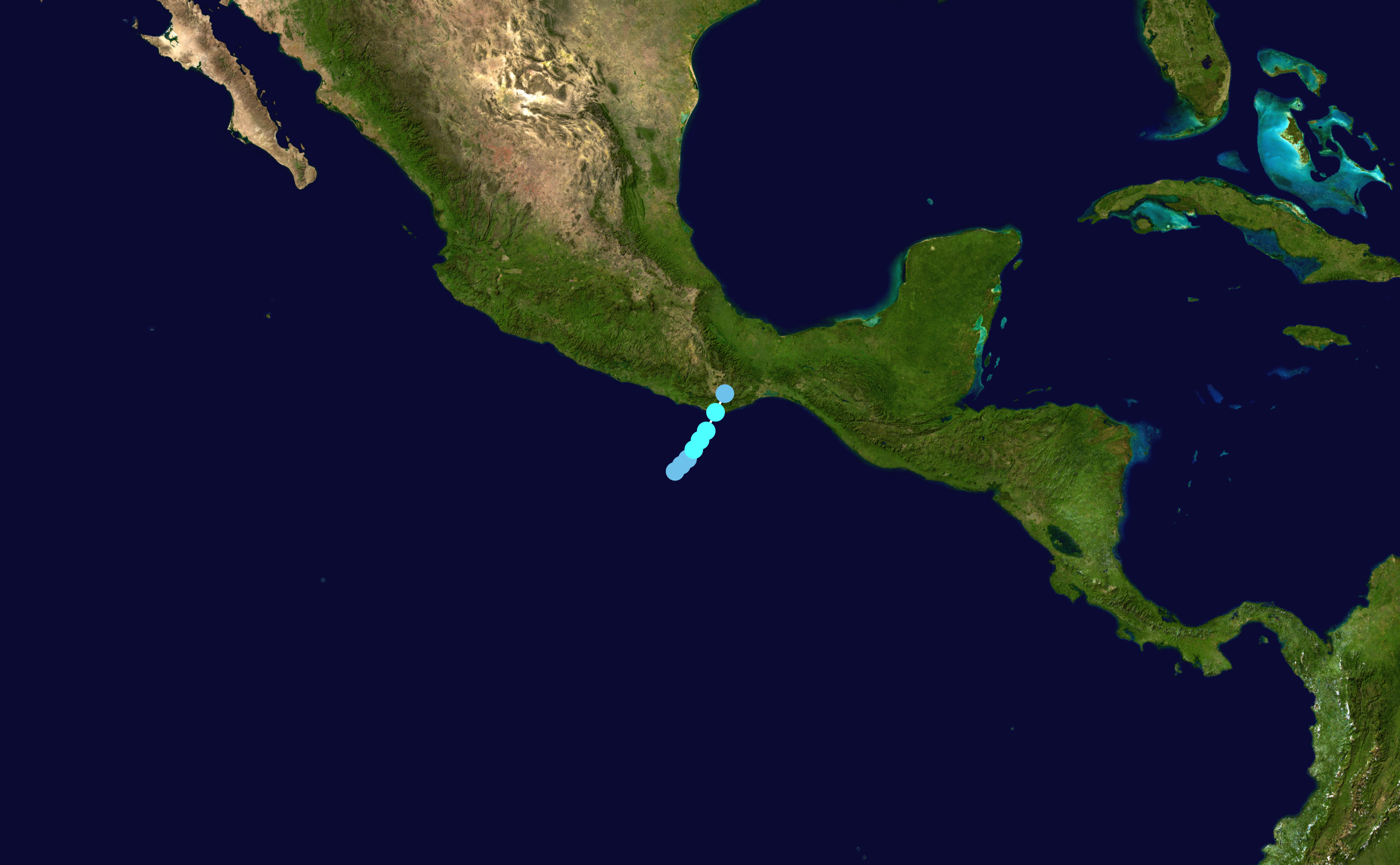
Map plotting the storm's track and intensity, according to the Saffir–Simpson scale Map key Saffir–Simpson scale Tropical depression (≤38 mph, ≤62 km/h) Tropical storm (39–73 mph, 63–118 km/h) Category 1 (74–95 mph, 119–153 km/h) Category 2 (96–110 mph, 154–177 km/h) Category 3 (111–129 mph, 178–208 km/h) Category 4 (130–156 mph, 209–251 km/h) Category 5 (≥157 mph, ≥252 km/h) Unknown Storm type Tropical cyclone Subtropical cyclone Extratropical cyclone, remnant low, tropical disturbance, or monsoon depression

The origins of Beatriz was first traced to a tropical wave which exited the coast of West Africa on May 18. The wave moved westward through the Atlantic and Caribbean with minimal convection, though convection increased when the wave moved into the Eastern Pacific Ocean from Central America through May 25 and 26. A broad area of low pressure developed from the wave about 700 miles (1,100 km) south-southeast of Acapulco, Mexico. Over the next few days, the circulation of the low remained elongated, but favorable conditions allowed the system to develop organized convection. Early on May 31, the low was found better organized, leading the NHC to classify the disturbance as a tropical depression at 12:00 UTC on May 31 around 150 miles (240 km) southwest of Puerto Angel, Mexico. The depression moved slowly northeastward embedded within an area of deep southwesterly flow around a large mid to upper-level trough. In an environment defined by warm waters and light to moderate wind shear the depression was upgraded into Tropical Storm Beatriz while 40 miles (64 km) southwest of Puerto Angel at 18:00 UTC on June 1. Beatriz reached its peak intensity with maximum sustained winds of 45 mph (75 km/h) and a minimum barometric pressure of 1002 mbar (hPa; 29.59 inHg) shortly before making landfall west of Puerto Angel that evening. Beatriz weakened to a tropical depression by 06:00 UTC on June 2 and quickly dissipated over the mountainous terrain of Mexico. The remnants of Beatriz still maintained some convection and moved into the Gulf of Mexico where they failed to redevelop due to strong wind shear.

== Preparations and impact ==
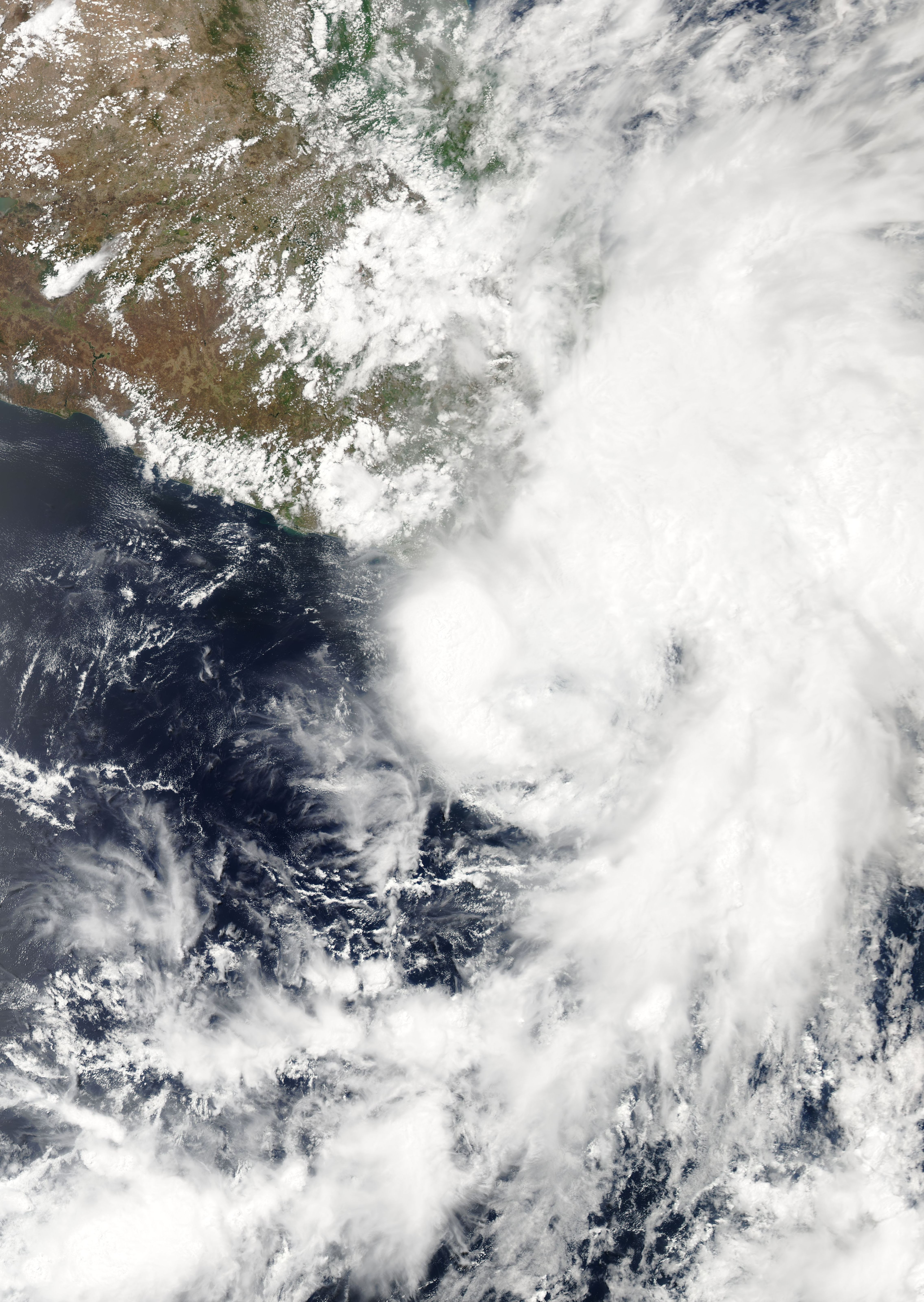
Beatriz nearing landfall in Mexico on June 1.

In preparation for Beatriz, the government of Mexico issued a Tropical Storm Watch and eventually Warning from Salina Cruz to Puerto Escondido in Oaxaca. The warning was discontinued by 06:00 UTC on June 2 as Beatriz moved inland. In Oaxaca, schools were closed until June 3 and flights out of Bahías de Huatulco International Airport were cancelled.

According to local officials, Beatriz was responsible for six fatalities including two children and four women who were killed in mudslides in Oaxaca. News reports indicated that hundreds of mudslides occurred across Southwestern Mexico leaving dozens of roads impassible including sections of Federal Highway 200. A portion of the Oaxaca-Tehuantepec Highway was washed away and a bridge on the highway received some damage. Several rivers across the region overflowed their banks which affected homes in numerous communities. However, the rainfall brought much needed drought relief to the region filling a local reservoir to 70% capacity for the first time in two years.

== See also ==
- List of storms named Beatriz
- Weather of 2017
- Tropical cyclones in 2017
- Timeline of the 2017 Pacific hurricane season
- List of Eastern Pacific tropical storms
- Tropical Storm Barbara (2007) – affected the same area as Beatriz.
- Tropical Depression Twelve-E (2011) – affected similar areas with disastrous effects.
- Hurricane Barbara (2013) – made landfall in roughly the same area.
