= Hurricane Beatriz (2011) =

Category 1 Pacific hurricane in 2011

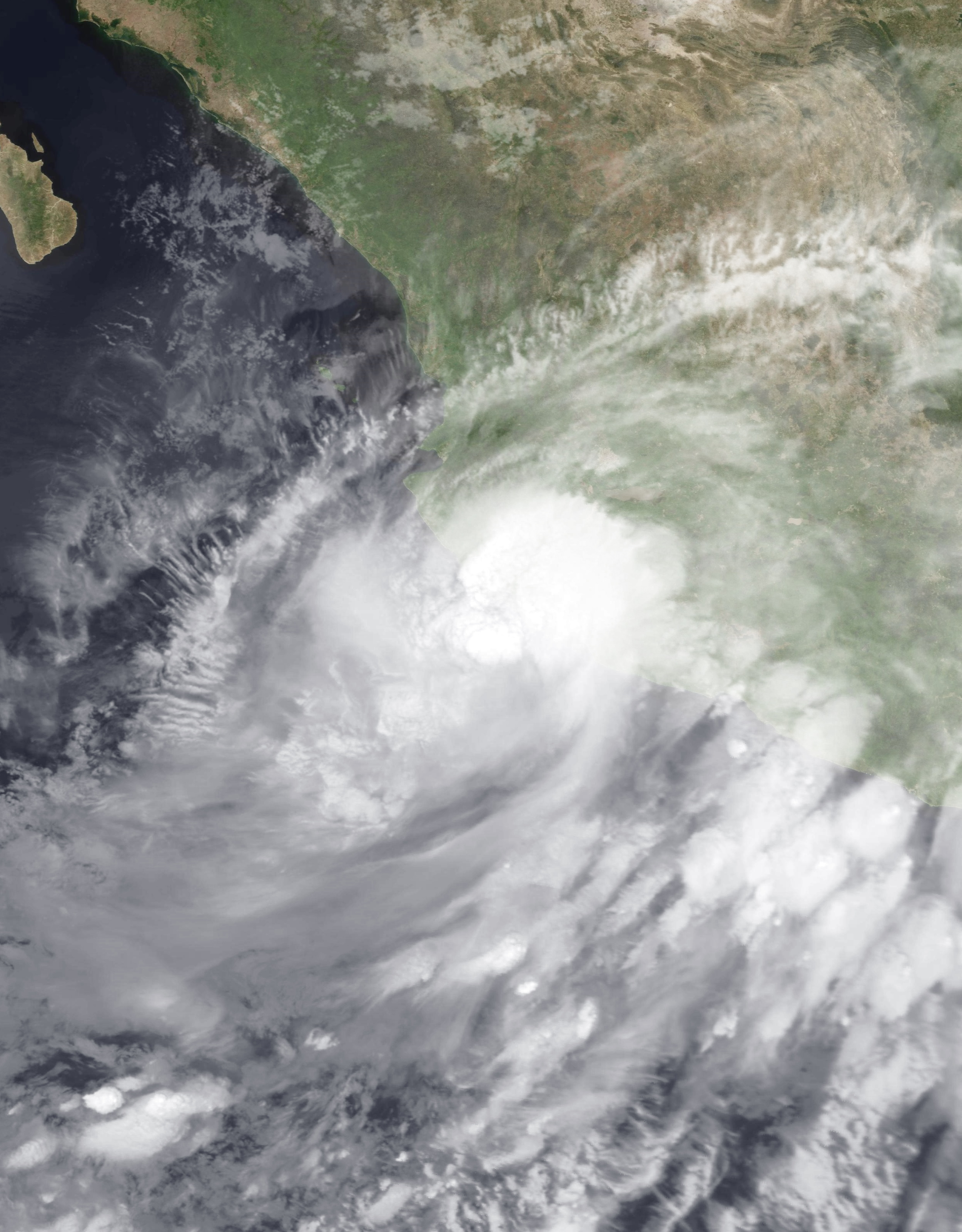
- Beatriz shortly after peak intensity while brushing the coast of Mexico on June 21

Meteorological history
- Formed: June 19, 2011
- Dissipated: June 22, 2011

Category 1 hurricane
- 1-minute sustained (SSHWS/NWS)
- Highest winds: 90 mph (150 km/h)
- Lowest pressure: 977 mbar (hPa); 28.85 inHg

Overall effects
- Fatalities: 4
- Damage: Minimal
- Areas affected: Southwestern Mexico
- IBTrACS
- Part of the 2011 Pacific hurricane season

Hurricane Beatriz was a Category 1 hurricane that killed four people after brushing the western coast of Mexico in June 2011. The second named storm and hurricane of the 2011 Pacific hurricane season, Beatriz originated from an area of disturbed weather on June 19, several hundred miles south of Mexico, and gradually intensified. Gaining latitude, the system became increasingly organized and reached hurricane status on the evening of June 20. The following morning, Beatriz attained winds of 90 mph (150 km/h) as it passed roughly 15 mi (20 km) of Mexico. Due to its interaction with land, the hurricane abruptly weakened hours later. Early on June 22, Beatriz dissipated over open waters. Prior to Beatriz's arrival in Mexico, hurricane watches and warnings were issued for coastal areas. Hundreds of shelters opened across the states of Colima and Guerrero. Heavy rains from the storm triggered significant flooding along the Sabana River in Acapulco, killing four people. However, the overall effects of Beatriz were limited and the rains were largely beneficial in mitigating a severe drought.

== Meteorological history ==
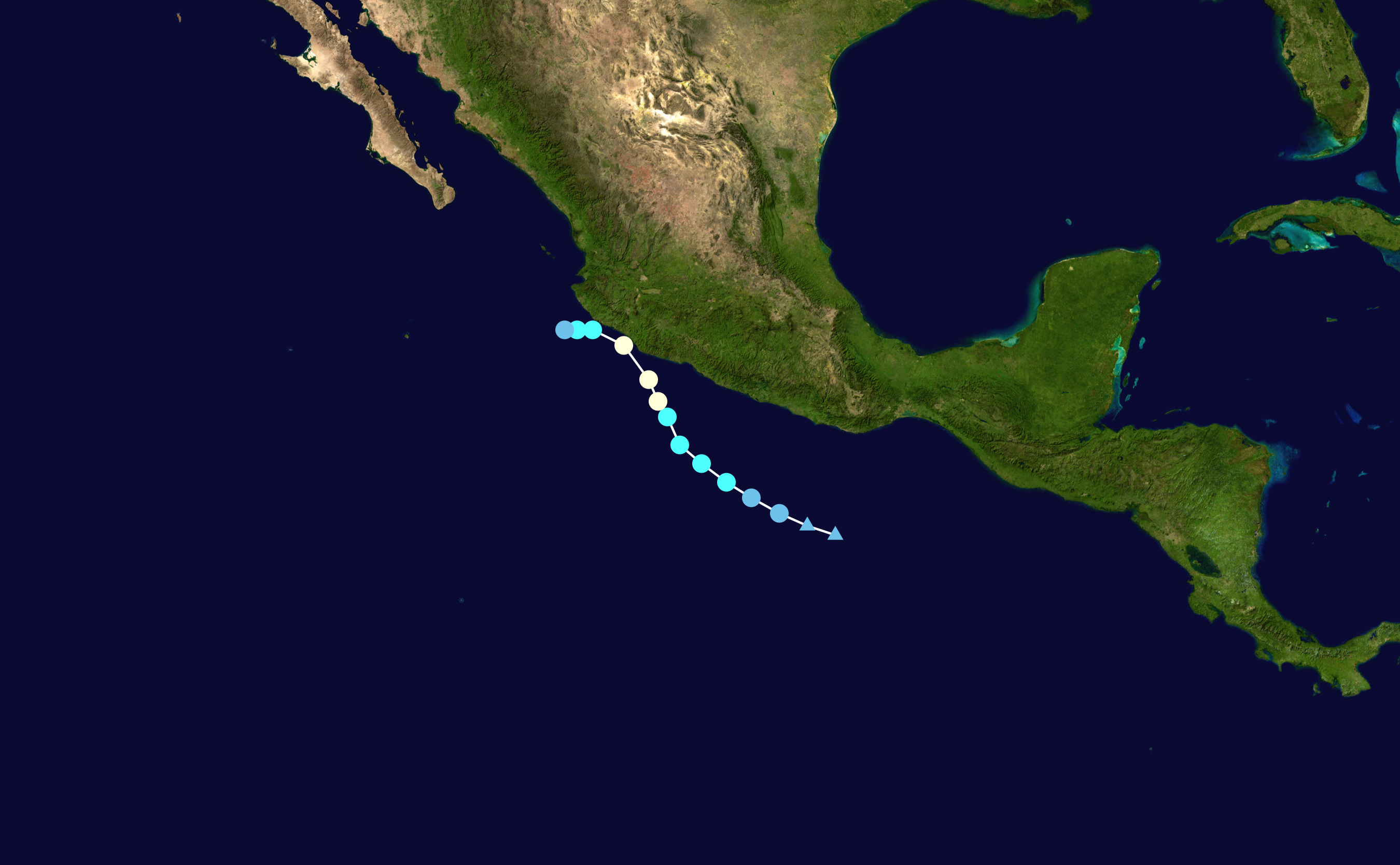
Map plotting the storm's track and intensity, according to the Saffir–Simpson scale Map key Saffir–Simpson scale Tropical depression (≤38 mph, ≤62 km/h) Tropical storm (39–73 mph, 63–118 km/h) Category 1 (74–95 mph, 119–153 km/h) Category 2 (96–110 mph, 154–177 km/h) Category 3 (111–129 mph, 178–208 km/h) Category 4 (130–156 mph, 209–251 km/h) Category 5 (≥157 mph, ≥252 km/h) Unknown Storm type Tropical cyclone Subtropical cyclone Extratropical cyclone, remnant low, tropical disturbance, or monsoon depression

On June 16, 2011, a trough situated off the southern coast of Guatemala showed signs of possible tropical cyclogenesis. Though located within an area favoring development, the system remained broad and disorganized as it moved slowly west-northwestward. Gradually, convection consolidated around an area of low pressure. On June 18, a Tropical Cyclone Formation Alert was issued for the system as it was expected to develop into a tropical depression within 24 hours. On the following day, the low further developed and was declared Tropical Depression Two-E by the National Hurricane Center at 1500 UTC. Upon being declared, the depression was located about 335 mi (540 km) south-southeast of Lázaro Cárdenas, Mexico. However, after post-analysis, the depression had actually developed nine hours earlier. Maintaining a west-northwesterly track in response to a subtropical ridge to the north, the depression was forecast to move into a favorable environment, characterized by low wind shear and sea surface temperatures up to 86 °F (30 °C). Three hours after classification, the depression strengthened Tropical Storm Beatriz, the second named storm of the season.

Early on June 20, convection increased markedly with several overshooting tops (denoted by cloud-top temperatures below −80 °C (−112 °F)) appearing on satellite imagery. A notable increase in southerly outflow also took place. As the subtropical ridge north of the storm weakened, Beatriz acquired a more northerly component to its track, bringing the center of the storm closer to Mexico. Convective bands gradually wrapped around the system throughout the day. During the afternoon hours of June 20, a hurricane hunter aircraft found Beatriz just below hurricane strength, and subsequently, the system was upgraded just a few hours later, while situated roughly 85 mi (140 km) southeast of Manzanillo, Mexico. Early on June 21, a 23 to 29 mi (37 to 47 km) wide eye developed within the central dense overcast. In light of this, the National Hurricane Center estimated Beatriz to have attained winds of 90 mph (150 km/h) along with a barometric pressure of 977 mbar (hPa; 28.85 inHg); however, it was noted that this could be conservative based on estimates of 105 mph (165 km/h) from the University of Wisconsin and the Satellite Analysis Branch.

Throughout the morning of June 21, Beatriz brushed the coast of Mexico, with the center passing roughly 15 mi (20 km) south-southeast of La Fortuna, Mexico. Centered just off the coast of Mexico, the system interacted with land and began weakening. Hours later, convection rapidly diminished as dry air became entrained in the circulation. In response to quick degradation of the system's structure, the NHC downgraded Beatriz to a tropical storm. Rapid weakening continued throughout the day and by the evening hours, the storm no longer had a defined circulation. Lacking an organized center and deep convection, the final advisory was issued on Beatriz. The storm's remnants persisted for several more hours before dissipating roughly 175 mi (280 km) southwest of Cabo Corrientes, Jalisco.

== Preparations and impact ==
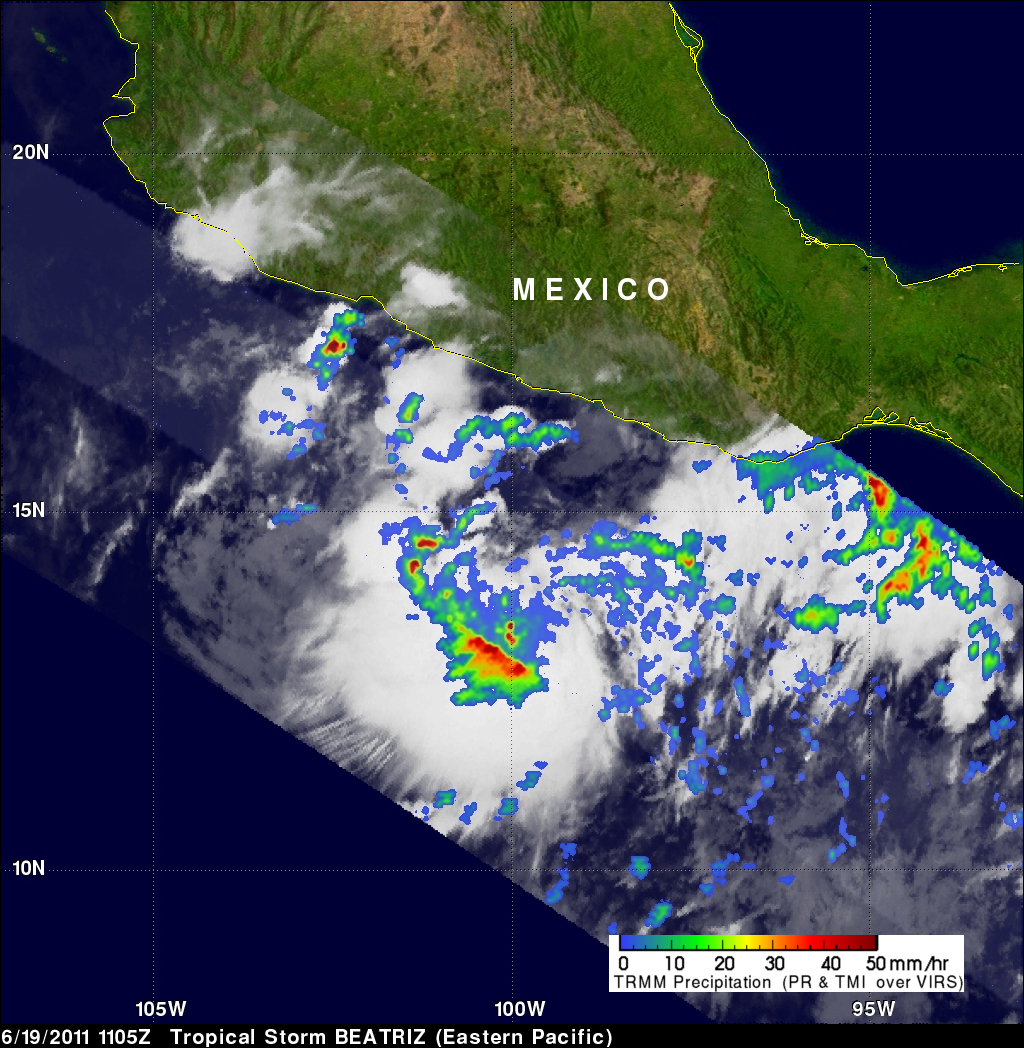
TRMM image of Beatriz on June 19

Following the classification of Tropical Depression Two-E on June 19, the Government of Mexico issued a tropical storm warning for coastal areas between Zihuatanejo and Manzanillo. A hurricane watch was also put in place from Tecpan de Galeana to Punta San Telmo. Later that day, the tropical storm warning was upgraded to a hurricane warning and the watch was extended westward to La Fortuna. As Beatriz continued to strengthen, the watches and warnings were extended westward to Cabo Corrientes on June 20. Early on June 21, the easternmost advisories were discontinued as Beatriz moved away. Later that morning, all watches and warnings were discontinued in light of Beatriz's rapid weakening.

In Colima and Jalisco, residents were warned of heavy rains that could trigger flooding and mudslides. Schools across both states canceled classes for June 21. In Colima, 236 shelters were opened to the public. Additionally, the Mexican Navy was placed on standby for hurricane relief. A total of 980 temporary shelters were opened in Guerrero, many of which were in Acapulco, as many residents were expected to evacuate flood-prone area. An orange-level alert was issued for portions of Chiapas in light of potentially heavy rains. Throughout Western and Southwestern Mexico, the Servicio Meteorológico Nacional (National Weather Service) advised that all air and sea traffic be suspended until the passage of Beatriz.

Across Guerrero, Beatriz produced heavy rain, peaking at 222.5 mm (8.76 in) in Copala, Guerrero. Several homes across the state were damaged. In Acapulco, 380 homes were inundated by flood waters, prompting evacuations in areas built in 1999 to relocate residents after Hurricane Pauline. Several landslides blocked off roads and a 100 m (330 ft) section of a roundabout was destroyed. In the community of Amatillo, three people were killed after being washed away by flood waters. Heavy rains from Beatriz caused the Sabana River to overflow its banks, placing 150 homes across 14 colonias under water. One person drowned in San Agustín after falling in the swollen river. Twenty-seven colonias in and around the city lost power after muddy floodwaters entered a substation. Throughout Oaxaca, at least a dozen homes lost their roofs due to high winds. Portions of Colima, Chiapas, Michoacán and Jalisco experienced heavy rains; however, in many areas, the rain proved beneficial in mitigating a severe drought.

== See also ==
- Other storms with the same name
- Hurricane Lily (1971)
