= 2017 hurricane season =

2017 hurricane season may refer to:

- 2017 Atlantic hurricane season
- 2017 Pacific hurricane season
