= 2023 Pacific hurricane season =

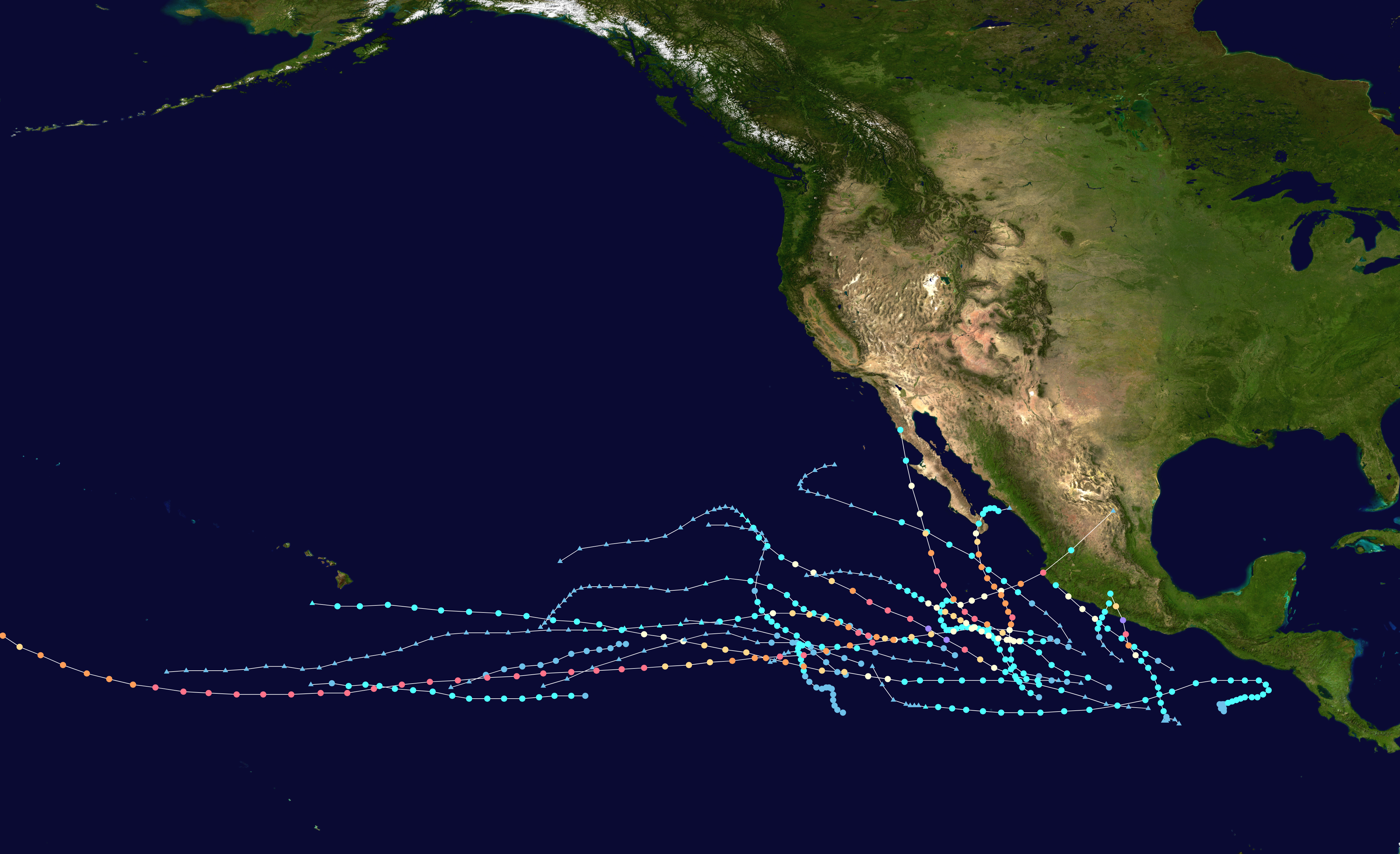
- Season summary map

Seasonal boundaries
- First system formed: June 27, 2023
- Last system dissipated: November 26, 2023

Strongest storm
- Name: Otis
  - Maximum winds: 165 mph (270 km/h) (1-minute sustained)
  - Lowest pressure: 922 mbar (hPa; 27.23 inHg)

Seasonal statistics
- Total depressions: 20
- Total storms: 17
- Hurricanes: 10
- Major hurricanes (Cat. 3+): 8
- ACE: 165.9
- Total fatalities: ≥ 67 total
- Total damage: ≥ $13.1 billion (2023 USD)

Related articles
- Timeline of the 2023 Pacific hurricane season; 2023 Atlantic hurricane season; 2023 Pacific typhoon season; 2023 North Indian Ocean cyclone season

The 2023 Pacific hurricane season was an active and highly destructive Pacific hurricane season which went on to become the costliest on record, primarily due to Hurricane Otis. In the Eastern Pacific basin (east of 140°W), 17 named storms formed; 10 of those became hurricanes, of which 8 strengthened into major hurricanes – double the seasonal average. (Note: Hurricanes reaching Category 3 and higher—1-minute sustained winds higher than 110 miles per hour (178 km/h)—on the Saffir–Simpson scale are described as major hurricanes.) In the Central Pacific basin (between 140°W and the International Date Line), no tropical cyclones formed for the fourth consecutive season, though four entered into the basin from the east. Collectively, the season had an above-normal accumulated cyclone energy (ACE) value of approximately 168 units. This season saw the return of El Niño and its associated warmer sea surface temperatures in the basin, which fueled the rapid intensification of several powerful storms. It officially began on May 15, 2023 in the Eastern Pacific, and on June 1 in the Central; both ended on November 30. These dates, adopted by convention, historically describe the period in each year when most tropical cyclogenesis occurs in these regions of the Pacific.

Forecasts at the outset of the 2023 season predicted busier-than-normal tropical cyclone activity in the eastern Pacific basin, largely due to El Niño. However, no tropical cyclones developed until June 27, when Hurricane Adrian initially formed, becoming the latest first-named Eastern Pacific tropical storm since Tropical Storm Agatha in 2016. In July, Hurricane Calvin became the season's first major hurricane, later passing just south of the Big Island of Hawaii as a tropical storm, bringing widespread rainfall to the area and neighboring Maui. In August, Category 4 Hurricane Dora passed south of the Hawaiian Islands and contributed to strong gradient winds over Hawaii, which in turn helped fan the flames of multiple devastating wildfires. Later that month, Hurricane Hilary made landfall as a tropical storm in Baja California, later bringing torrential rainfall and gusty winds to the Southwestern United States. In early September, Hurricane Jova, the first Category 5 hurricane in the basin since 2018, caused rainfall, high waves and rip currents in areas previously affected by Hilary.

October saw four tropical cyclones strike the Pacific Coast of Mexico. Tropical Storm Max struck Guerrero on October 9, resulting in intense flooding. Less than two days later, Hurricane Lidia rapidly intensified into a Category 4 hurricane and made landfall at peak intensity on Jalisco. Lidia was followed by Hurricane Norma, which made two landfalls in northwestern Mexico less than two weeks later. Hurricane Otis developed in the time period between Norma's landfalls, rapidly intensified into the second Category 5 hurricane of the season, and devastated Acapulco when it became the first Pacific hurricane to make landfall at Category 5 intensity, therefore surpassing Hurricane Patricia as the strongest landfalling Pacific hurricane on record. Tropical Storm Pilar caused severe flooding in El Salvador and Honduras while passing offshore. In November, the last storm of the season, Ramon, dissipated with no effects to land.

== Seasonal forecasts ==
Record		Named storms	Hurricanes	Major hurricanes	Ref
Average (1991–2020):		15	8	4	
Record high activity:		1992: 27	2015: 16	2015: 11	
Record low activity:		2010: 8	2010: 3	2003: 0	
Date	Source	Named storms	Hurricanes	Major hurricanes	Ref
May 4, 2023	SMN	16–22	7–11	3–5	
May 25, 2023	NOAA	14–20	7–11	4–8	
	Area	Named storms	Hurricanes	Major hurricanes	Ref
Actual activity:	EPAC	17	10	8	
Actual activity:	CPAC	0	0	0	
Actual combined activity:		17	10	8	

In advance of each Pacific hurricane season, forecasts of hurricane activity are issued by the United States National Oceanic and Atmospheric Administration (NOAA)'s Climate Prediction Center and Mexico's Servicio Meteorológico Nacional (SMN). These include weekly and monthly changes in significant factors that help determine the number of tropical storms, hurricanes, and major hurricanes within a particular year. According to NOAA, the average eastern Pacific hurricane season between 1991 and 2020 contained roughly 15 tropical storms, 8 hurricanes, 4 major hurricanes, with a near-normal accumulated cyclone energy (ACE) index between 80 and 115. Broadly speaking, ACE is a measure of the power of a tropical or subtropical storm multiplied by the length of time it existed. It is only calculated for full advisories on specific tropical and subtropical systems reaching or exceeding wind speeds of 39 mph (63 km/h). NOAA typically categorizes a season as above-average, average, or below-average based on the cumulative ACE index, but the number of tropical storms, hurricanes, and major hurricanes within a hurricane season is sometimes also considered.

On May 4, 2023, SMN issued its forecast for the season, forecasting a total of 16–22 named storms developing, with 7–11 hurricanes, and 3–5 major hurricanes. Factors they expected to increase activity were above-average sea surface temperatures across the eastern Pacific and the El Niño–Southern Oscillation (ENSO) remaining in the neutral phase, with the possibility of a strong El Niño developing. On May 25, 2023, NOAA issued their outlook, calling for an above-normal season with 14–20 named storms overall, 7–11 hurricanes, 4–8 major hurricanes, and an ACE index of 90% to 155% of the median.

== Seasonal summary ==
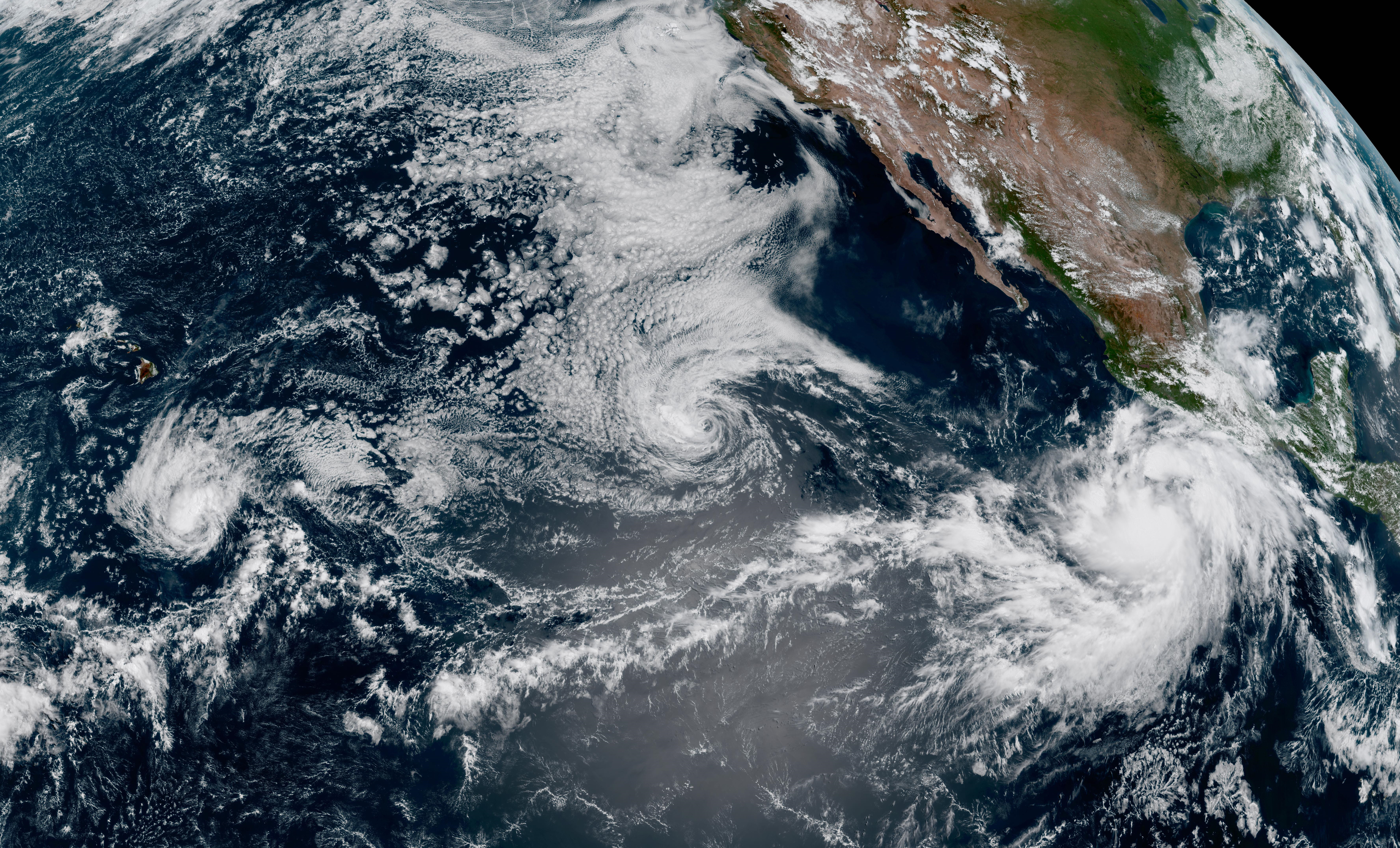
Three simultaneous active tropical cyclones in the Pacific Ocean on August 16: Tropical Storm Greg (left), Tropical Storm Fernanda (middle), and Tropical Storm Hilary (right)

The accumulated cyclone energy (ACE) index for the 2023 Pacific hurricane season (Eastern Pacific and Central Pacific combined), as calculated by Colorado State University using data from the National Hurricane Center, was 164 units, (Note: The total represents the sum of the squares of the maximum sustained wind speed (knots) for every (sub)tropical storm's intensity of over 33 knots (38 mph; 61 km/h), divided by 10,000 while they are above that threshold; therefore, tropical depressions are not included.) above the 1991–2020 average of 115 units. ACE is a rough measure of the energy generated by a tropical or subtropical cyclone over its lifespan, and is calculated every six hours when the tropical cyclone has sustained wind speeds of at least of 39 mph (63 km/h). Therefore, a storm with a longer duration, such as Hurricane Dora, which had an ACE of 48.5 units before crossing into the Western Pacific, will have high values of ACE. It is only calculated for full advisories on specific tropical systems reaching or exceeding wind speeds of 39 mph (63 km/h), while tropical depressions are excluded from ACE calculations.

Overall, 20 tropical cyclones formed in the Eastern Pacific, with 17 intensifying into tropical storms. A total of 10 of these storms became hurricanes, and 8 became major hurricanes. The season was very active compared to the more inactive seasons since 2019. No tropical cyclones formed in the Central Pacific, though four did cross into the basin from the east – 1 tropical depression, 2 tropical storms, and 1 hurricane. At least 64 fatalities were recorded and damage totaled at least US$13.07–17.07 billion, mostly due to Hurricane Otis, with most of the rest due to flooding in California from the remnants of Hurricane Hilary. The above-average activity levels were largely attributed to the strong El Niño event, which brought anomalously high sea surface temperatures and low vertical wind shear to western parts of the basin.

The season officially began on May 15 in the Eastern Pacific, and on June 1 in the Central Pacific. The two hurricanes in June were twice the average for the month. However, the season's first storm, Adrian, did not form until June 27, which marked the second-latest date for the first storm of a season. July was below normal, although included the long-lived Hurricane Dora. August was more active and included two major hurricanes, Fernanda and Hilary, the latter of which struck Baja California as a tropical storm. September was quieter than normal with just two named storms, although one, Jova, reached Category 5 on the Saffir-Simpson scale. With five storms, October was the most active month of the season. Although major hurricanes occur every other October in the basin, there were three major hurricanes during the month. The first two, Lidia and Norma, hit Jalisco and Baja California Sur, respectively. The third, Otis, became the first Pacific hurricane to make landfall at Category 5 intensity, causing $12–16 billion (USD) (Note: All damage totals are valued as of 2023 and in United States dollars, unless otherwise noted.) in damage near Acapulco. Also in the month, Tropical Storm Max hit Mexico, and Tropical Storm Pilar produced deadly floods in Central America. The season ended when Tropical Storm Ramon dissipated on November 26.

== Systems ==
=== Hurricane Adrian ===
- Category 2 hurricane (SSHWS)
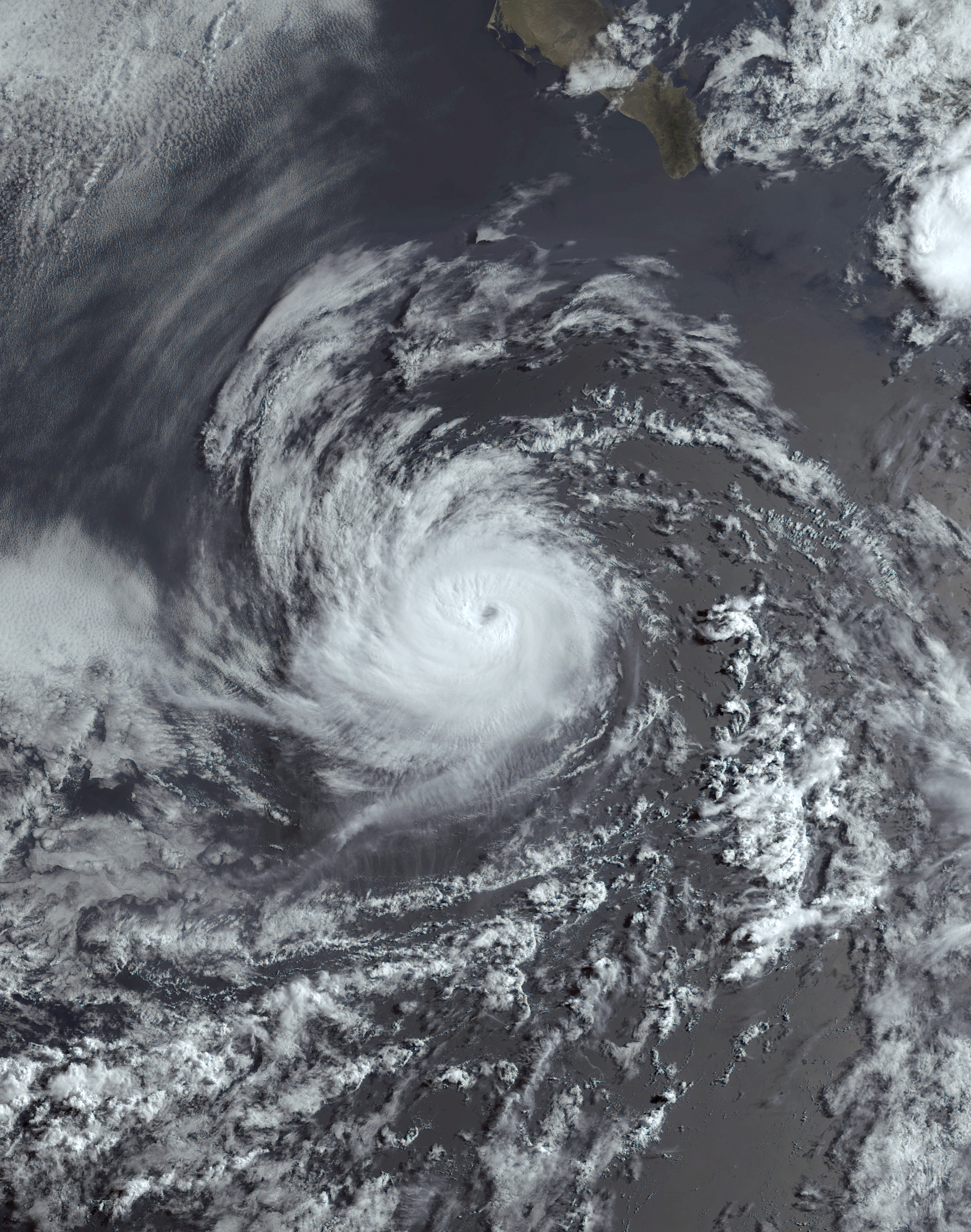
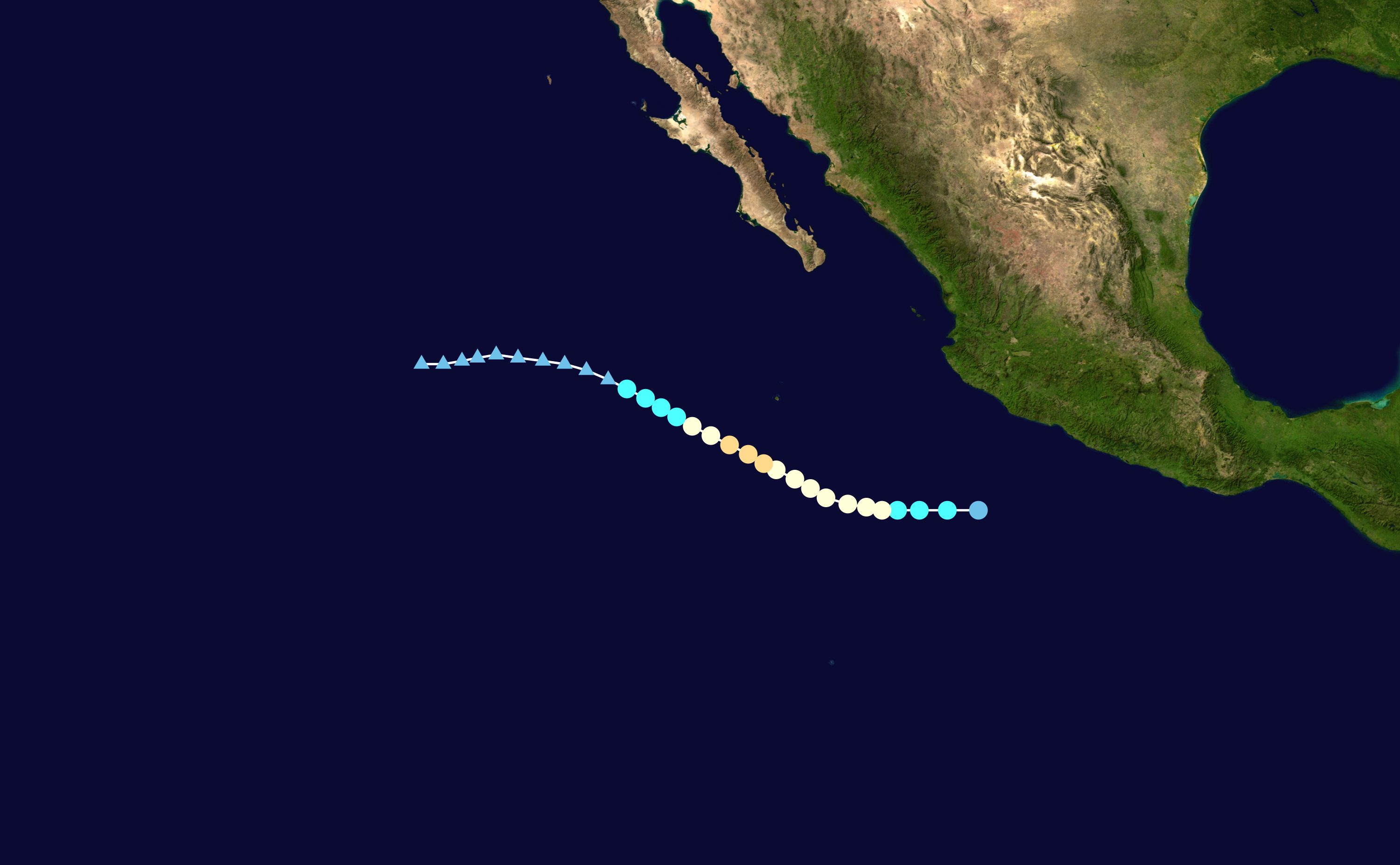
- Duration: June 27 – July 2
- Peak intensity: 105 mph (165 km/h) (1-min); 970 mbar (hPa)

On June 23, a broad area of low pressure formed off the coast of southern Mexico, in an area which the NHC had for several days been monitoring for potential tropical development. The disturbance quickly became better organized on June 27, and intensified to tropical storm at 18:00 UTC, being named Tropical Storm Adrian at 21:00 UTC. Adrian strengthened rapidly, and became the season's first hurricane at 12:00 UTC on June 28, while located about 360 mi (580 km) southwest of Manzanillo, Colima. It then reached Category 2 hurricane status on June 30, with the hurricane maintaining a distinct eye surrounded by a ring of −70 °C (−95 °F) convection on satellite. Adrian reached maximum sustained winds of 105 mph (165 km/h) that day, before entering an environment of stronger wind shear and cool sea surface temperatures, causing it to weaken to a tropical storm the next day. Adrian weakened to a tropical depression early on July 2, and degenerated into a remnant low later that day.

=== Hurricane Beatriz ===
- Category 1 hurricane (SSHWS)
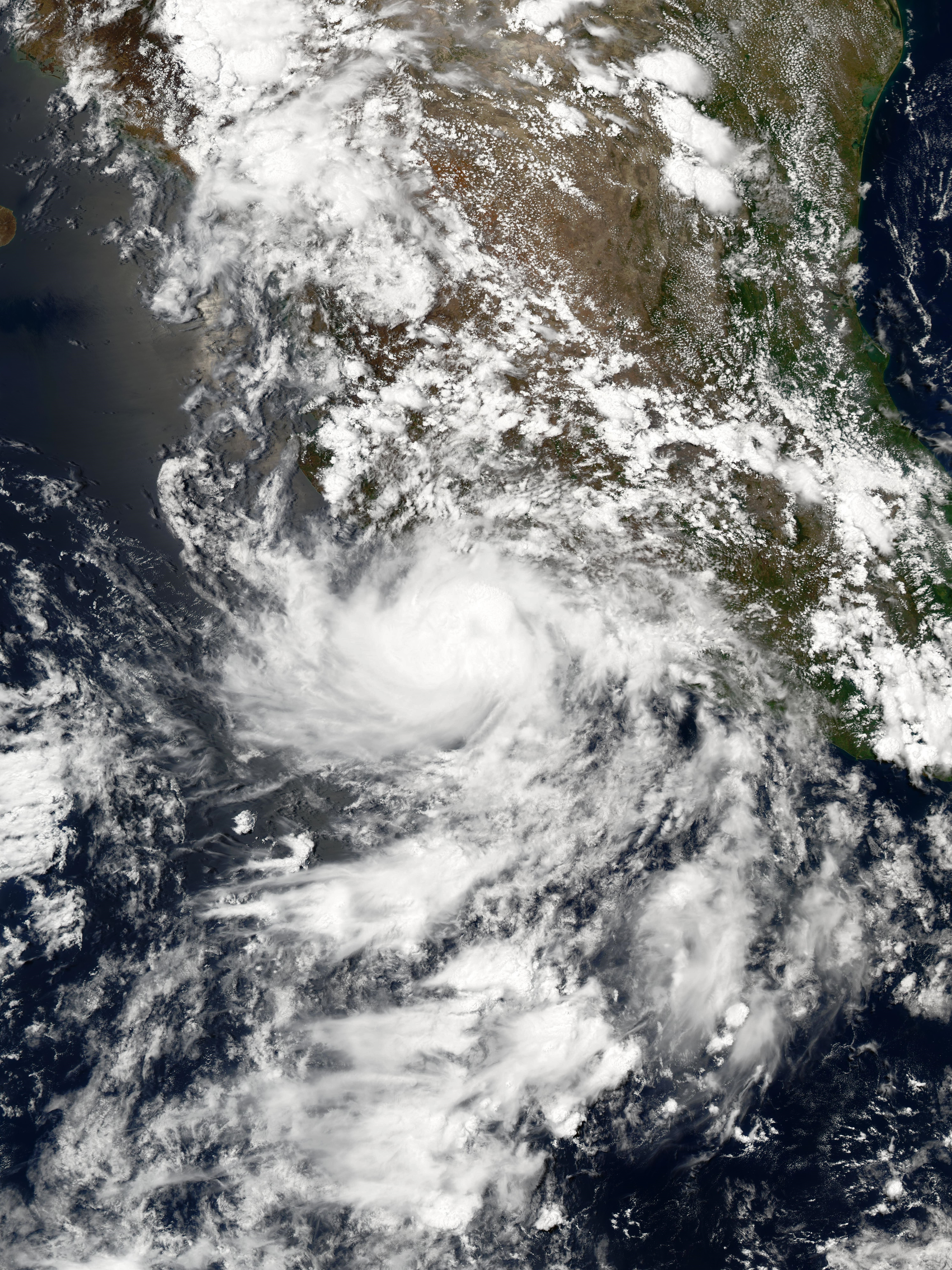
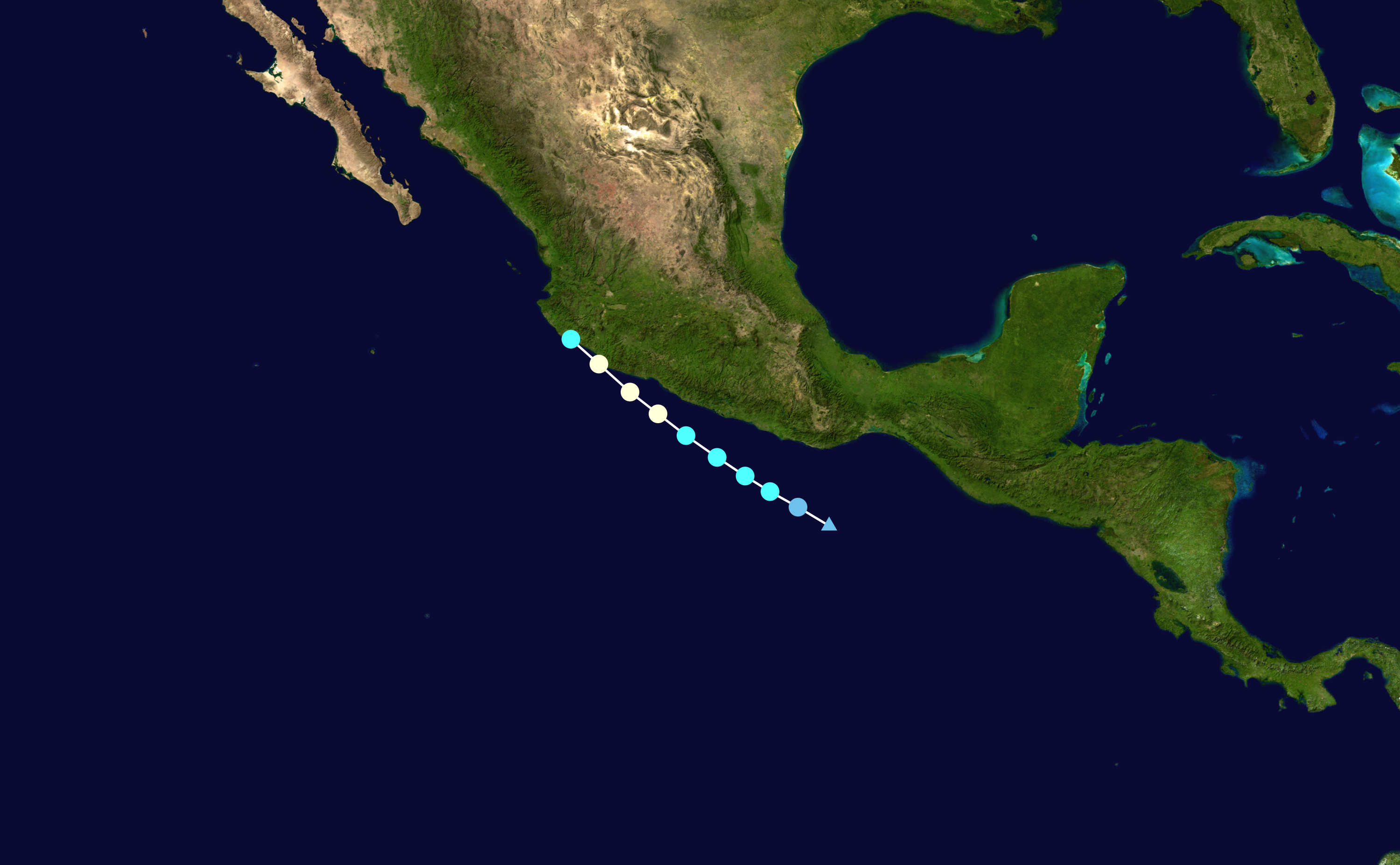
- Duration: June 29 – July 1
- Peak intensity: 85 mph (140 km/h) (1-min); 992 mbar (hPa)

On June 25, after dissipating over the central Caribbean, the remnant wave of Atlantic Tropical Storm Bret moved over Central America, merging with a nearby low-pressure area. Slow to organize, the disturbance ultimately coalesced, becoming Tropical Depression Two‑E at 09:00 UTC on June 29. Later, at 21:00 UTC, the depression became Tropical Storm Beatriz while located about 105 mi (170 km) south-southwest of Punta Maldonado, Guerrero. Paralleling the coast, Beatriz was upgraded to a hurricane at 15:00 UTC the next day and soon attained peak winds of 85 mph (140 km/h). An eye began to appear on satellite around this time. However, since Beatriz's circulation was severely disrupted by land interaction, the system weakened to a tropical storm early on July 1, and Beatriz dissipated later that day just offshore from Cabo Corrientes, Jalisco.

In Michoacán, which Beatriz strengthened into a hurricane directly offshore of, strong winds from the cyclone left significant damage across several municipalities. Papaya trees were strewn across the ground from their plantations, while the tile and tin roofs of hundreds of houses were severely damaged or destroyed, particularly in the small town of Maruata. Several communities were left without power for over 48 hours following the storm. Stranded vehicles, fence collapses and fallen trees were reported in the neighboring state of Guerrero, especially around the port city of Acapulco. Despite being well inland of the Pacific coast of Mexico, the state of Hidalgo saw torrential rainfall that flooded nearly 110 homes across three towns; however, no casualties were reported as a result. One person drowned in Mazatlán, Sinaloa, on July 1, while surfing the high waves generated by Beatriz's remnants.

=== Hurricane Calvin ===
- Category 3 hurricane (SSHWS)
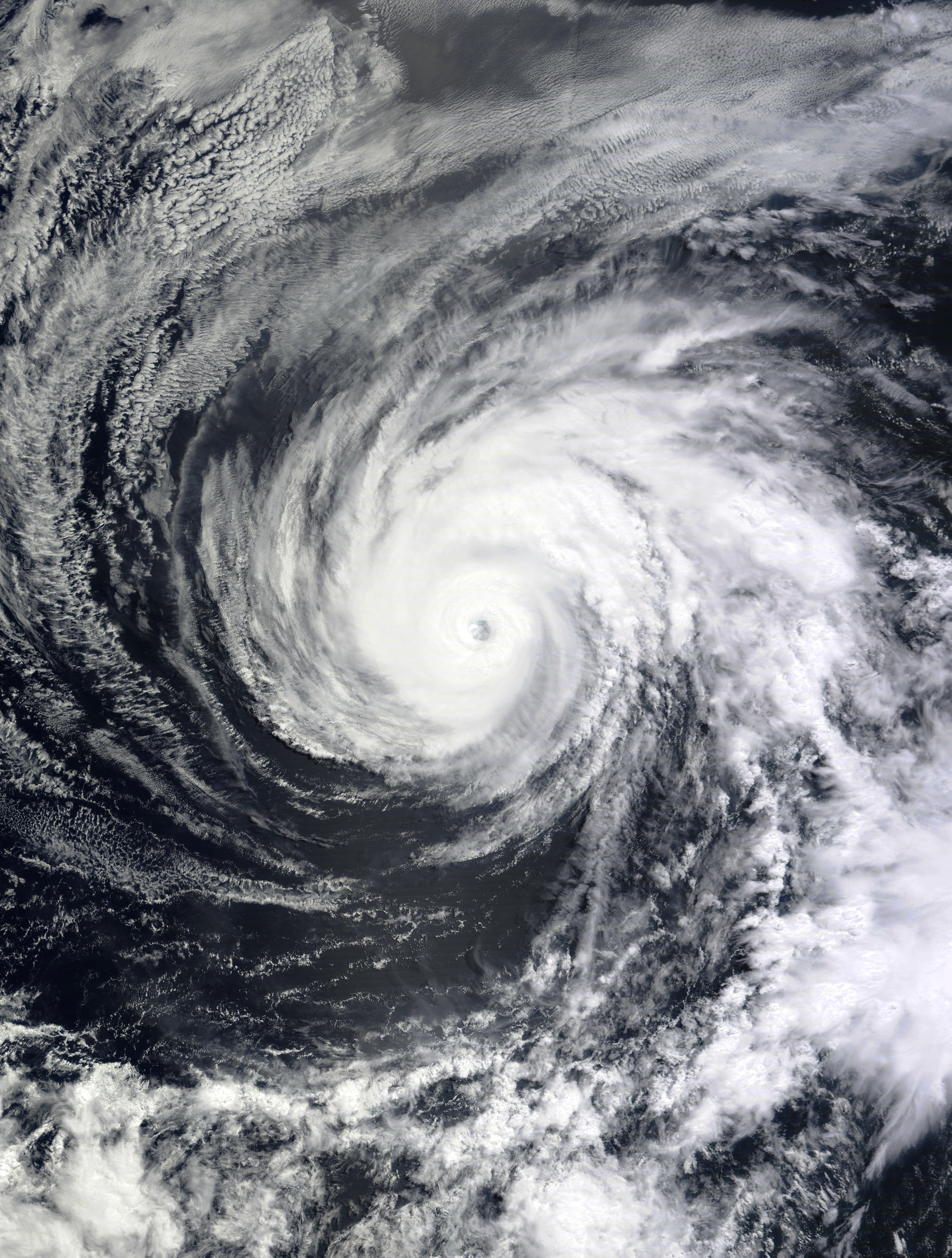
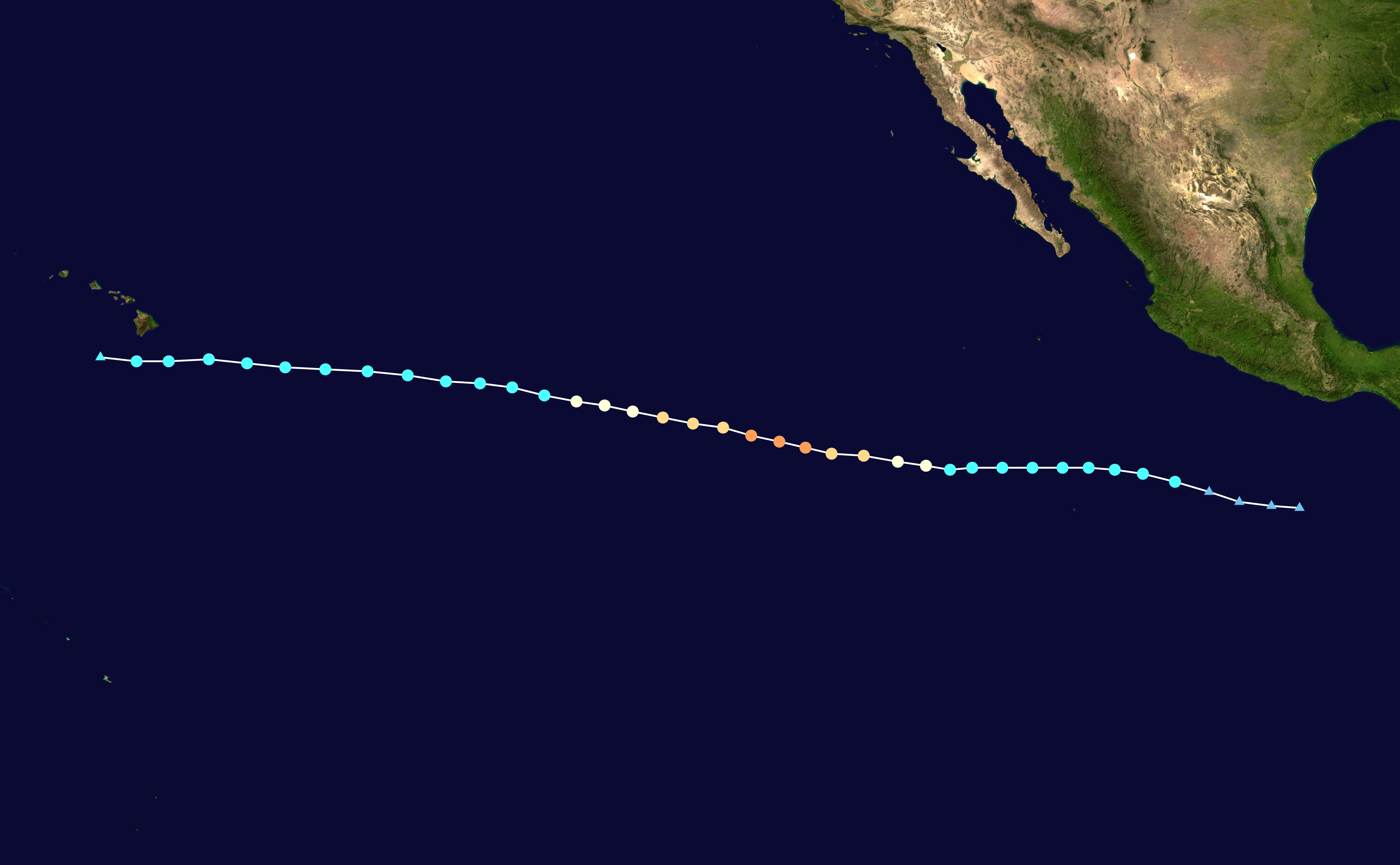
- Duration: July 11 – July 19
- Peak intensity: 125 mph (205 km/h) (1-min); 953 mbar (hPa)

An area of low pressure formed off the coast of southern Mexico on July 7. The disturbance became better organized over the course of several days, and developed a well-defined center on the afternoon of July 11, becoming Tropical Depression Three-E. By early the next day, the depression had begun developing a central dense overcast, and exhibiting banding features, and then intensified to tropical storm at 06:00 UTC, becoming Tropical Storm Calvin. Calvin moved westward out to sea within a favorable environment with low wind shear and warm sea surface temperatures, and became a Category 1 hurricane at 12:00 UTC on July 13. It then rapidly intensified and became the season's first major hurricane at 18:00 UTC on July 14. It had a well-defined 17-mile-wide (28 km) eye at the time, with a pronounced ring of deep convection surrounding it. A weakening trend began later that day, and by early on July 16, the system had fallen to tropical storm strength. Still moving generally westward, the storm crossed the 140th meridian shortly before 12:00 UTC on July 17, thus entering the central Pacific basin; its sustained winds at the time were near 50 mph (85 km/h). Then, early on July 19, Calvin passed just south of the Island of Hawaiʻi. Weakened by the close encounter with land, the storm began losing its tropical characteristics. Calvin became post-tropical by 18:00 UTC on July 19.

All state parks on the Big Island, as well as most of Hawaiʻi Volcanoes National Park, were shut beginning the afternoon of July 18, while public schools were closed for the whole of July 19. Eight emergency shelters were opened across the county on July 18. Calvin caused no significant damage; only minor flooding occurred in flood-prone areas of the Big Island. Rainfall reached up to 7.24 in (184 mm) at Honolii Stream, while peak gusts of 72 mph (116 km/h) and 70 mph (113 km/h) were recorded on the summits of Haleakalā and Mauna Kea, respectively.

=== Tropical Depression Four-E ===
- Tropical depression (SSHWS)
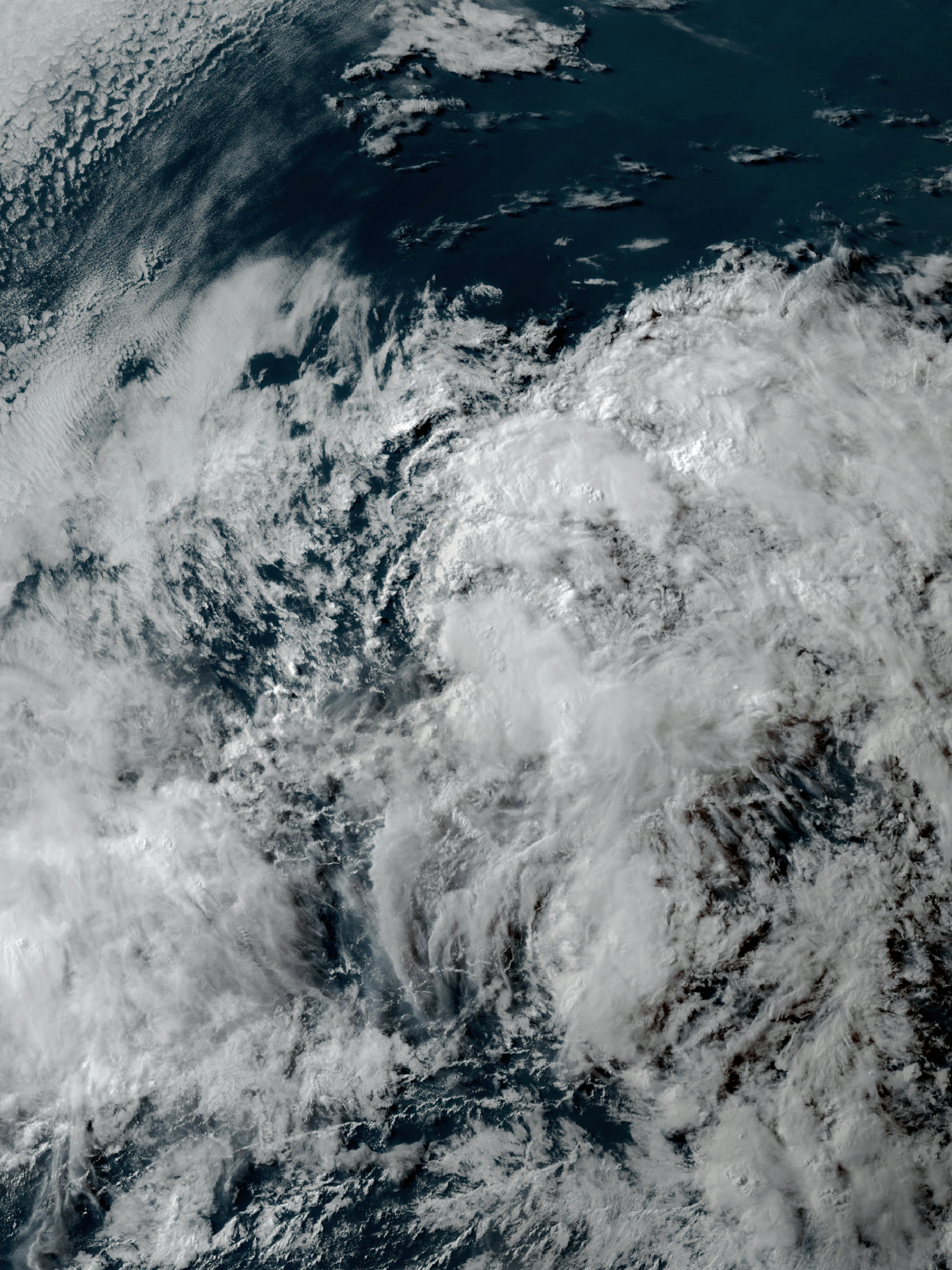
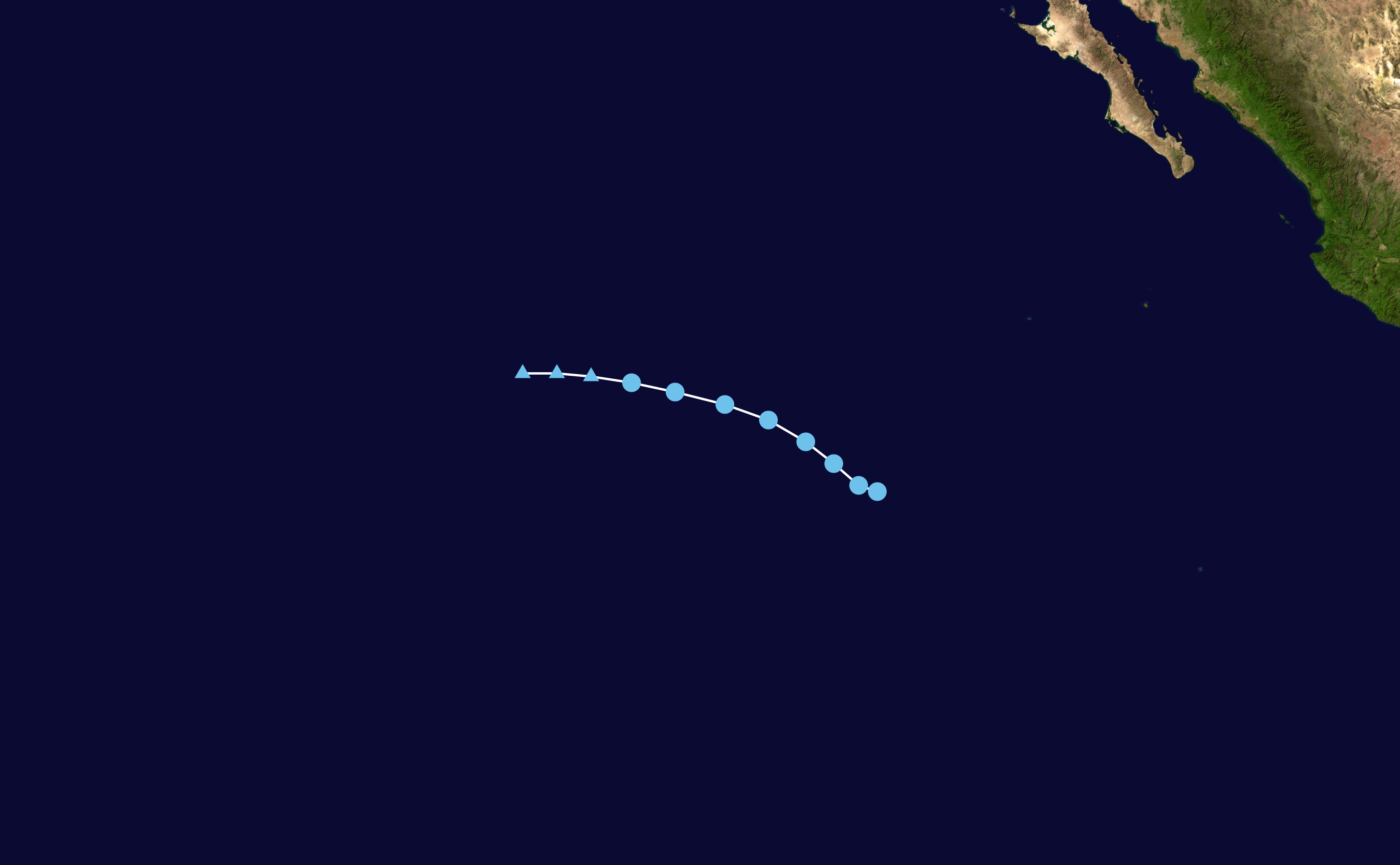
- Duration: July 20 – July 21
- Peak intensity: 35 mph (55 km/h) (1-min); 1006 mbar (hPa)

A tropical wave entered the Eastern Pacific on July 16 after moving across Central America. A broad low pressure area associated with the wave formed south of the coast of southwestern Mexico on July 17. The disturbance became better organized by July 20, and at 12:00 UTC, Tropical Depression Four-E formed southwest of the Baja California peninsula. Later that day, however, the depression's structure began deteriorating. It soon lost all of its deep convection, and degenerated into a remnant low by 00:00 UTC on July 22.

=== Hurricane Dora ===
- Category 4 hurricane (SSHWS)
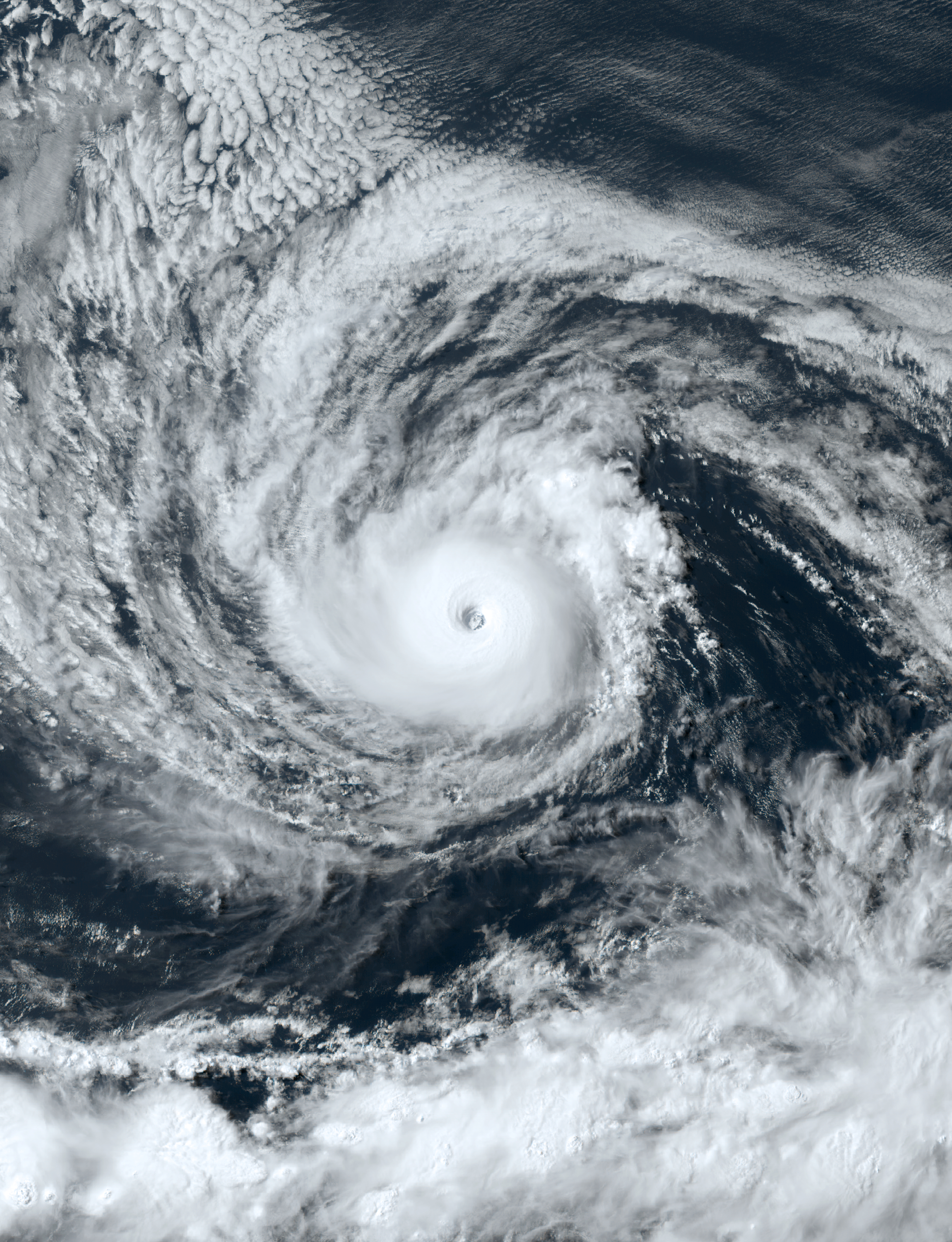
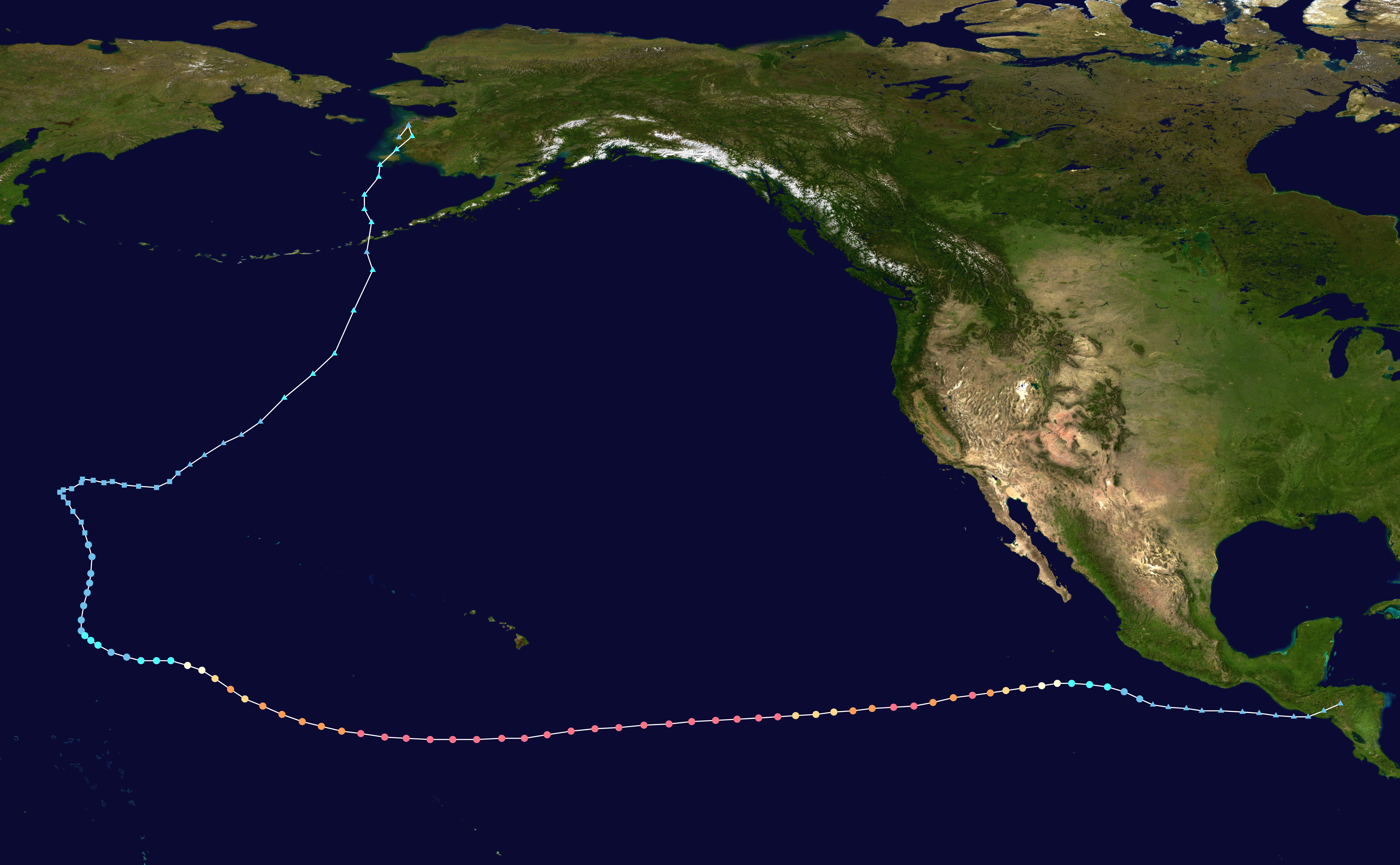
- Duration: July 31 – August 12 (exited basin)
- Peak intensity: 150 mph (240 km/h) (1-min); 939 mbar (hPa)

A tropical wave which the NHC had been monitoring since July 16 crossed over Central America into the Eastern Pacific on July 29, off the coast of El Salvador, producing a large area of rain and thunderstorms amid a favorable environment. The system became better organized on July 31, and Tropical Depression Five‑E developed that afternoon. Deep convection increased within the depression, and it strengthened into Tropical Storm Dora early the following day. During August 2–3, Dora rapidly intensified to Category 4 strength, far to the southwest of Cabo San Lucas, Baja California Sur. Then, after undergoing an eyewall replacement cycle, and weakening to a Category 3, it re-intensified to Category 4, with sustained winds reaching 140 mph (220 km/h) early on August 4. Later that day and into the next, the system weakened to Category 2, with winds dropping to 105 mph (165 km/h), before rebounding. Dora reached Category 4 for a third time on August 5, with sustained winds of 150 mph (240 km/h). At 15:00 UTC the next day, Dora, experiencing a slight fluctuation in intensity, crossed over into the Central Pacific basin. Later, on the morning of August 9, Dora strengthened once again, generating winds of 145 mph (230 km/h) amid a low-shear, warm sea surface temperatures environment. It continued to display annular characteristics, with a well-defined, symmetrical 9.2-mile-wide (15 km) eye, surrounded by a compact central dense overcast of less than 120 miles (190 km) wide. At 21:00 UTC on August 11, Dora weakened to Category 2 strength about 900 mi (1,450 km) south of Midway Island. It then crossed the International Date Line a few hours later, and was reclassified as Typhoon Dora.

A steep pressure gradient between a strong anticyclone to the north of Hawaii and Dora to the south produced incredibly strong gradient winds over the islands which in turn helped cause multiple wildfires in Hawaii. The most devastating fire broke out on Maui, where at least 101 people were killed. In addition, more than 2,200 buildings, primarily in Lahaina, were damaged or destroyed. The wildfires became the deadliest natural disaster in recorded Hawaii history.

=== Tropical Storm Eugene ===
- Tropical storm (SSHWS)
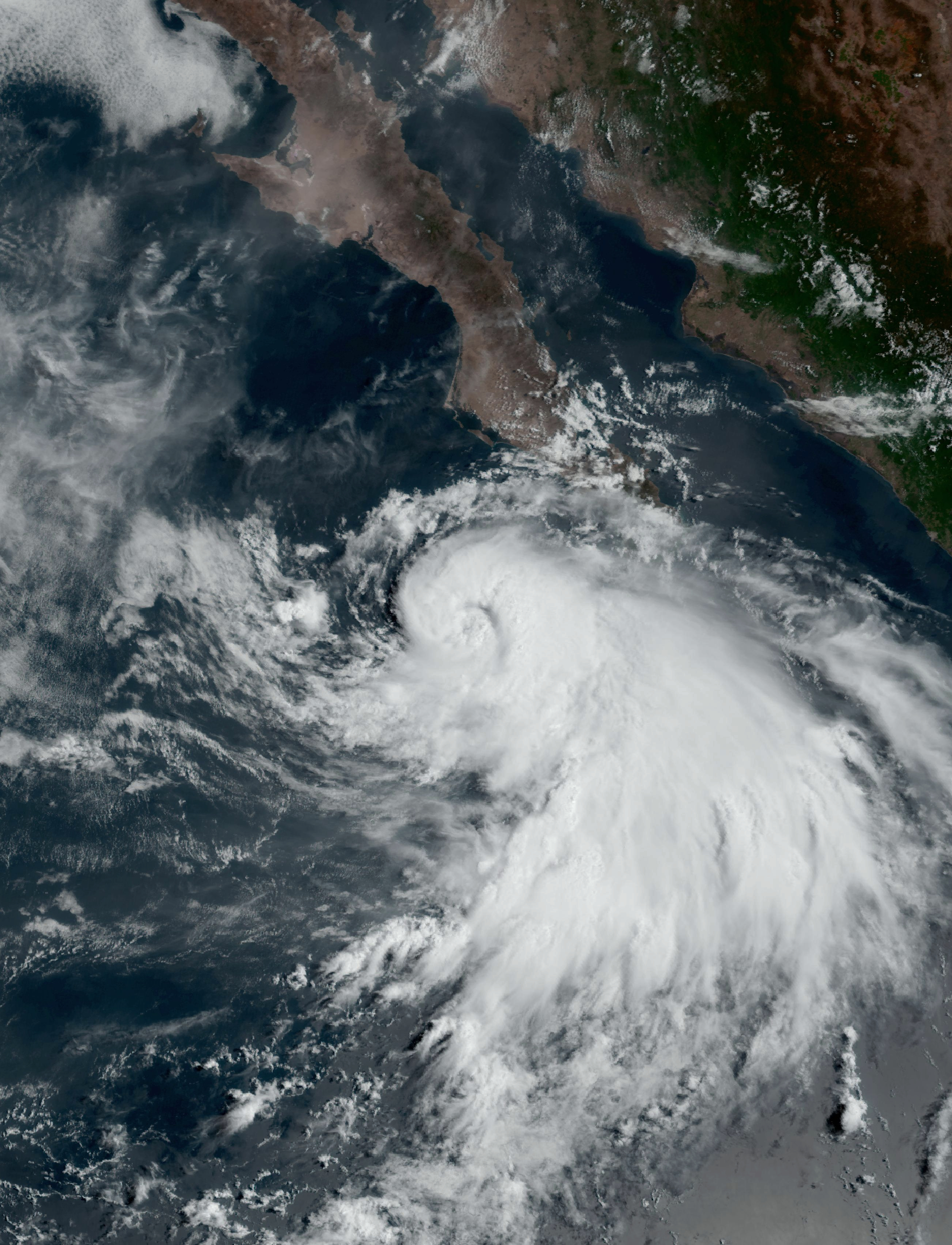
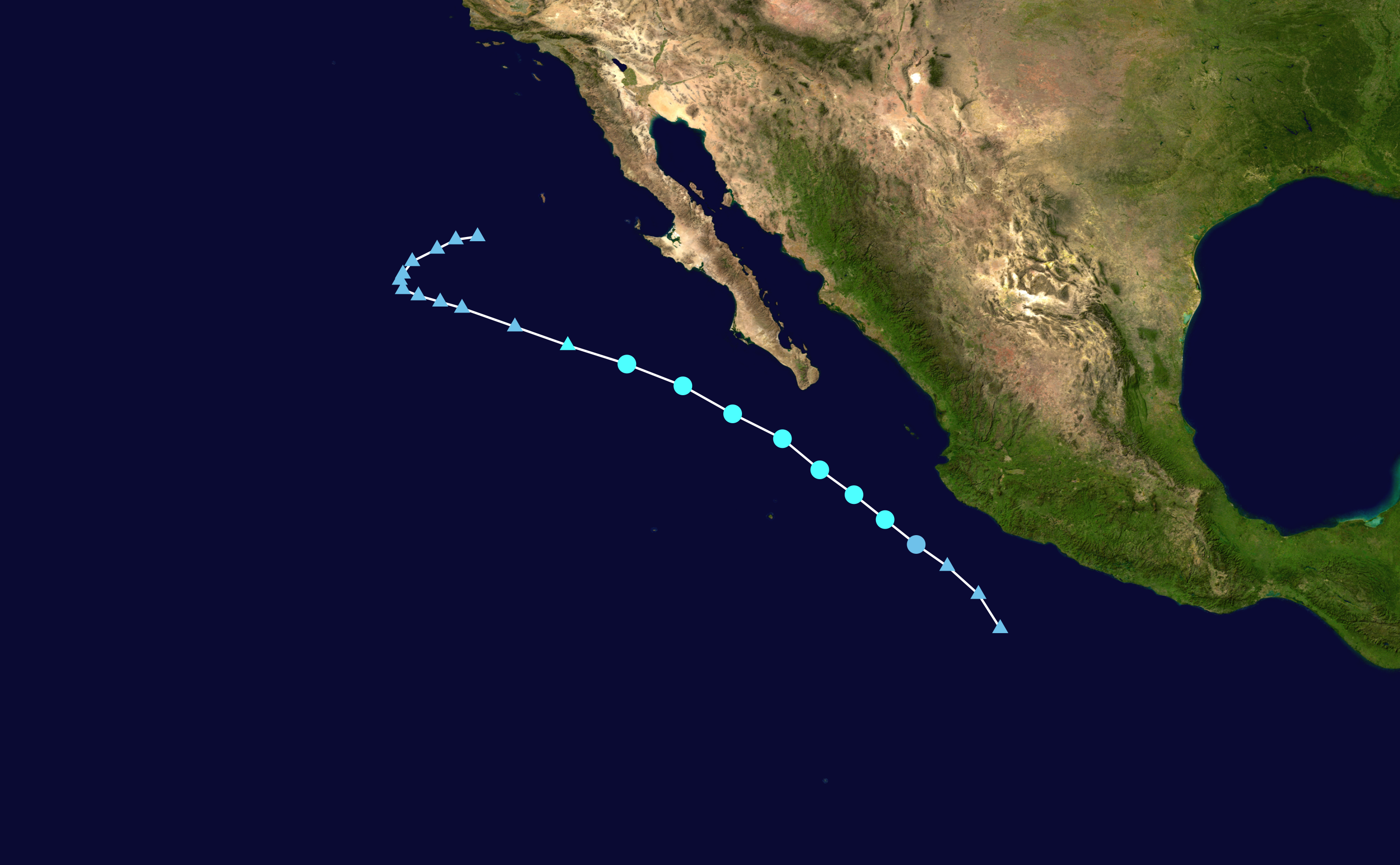
- Duration: August 5 – August 7
- Peak intensity: 70 mph (110 km/h) (1-min); 992 mbar (hPa)

On August 1, a tropical wave emerged offshore Guatemala. A low-pressure area developed a couple days later, as it passed southwest of Mexico. After further organization, the disturbance developed into a tropical depression around 12:00 UTC on August 5. Moving northwestward toward the southern tip of the Baja California peninsula under favorable conditions, the system began to rapidly intensify, becoming Tropical Storm Eugene six hours later, and attaining peak sustained winds of 70 mph (110 km/h) at 12:00 UTC on August 6. What appeared on satellite imagery to be a possible eye feature was observed at the center of the storm, but soon deteriorated. Later, Eugene moved over cold water west of the Baja California peninsula where its diminishing thunderstorm activity ceased, and it transitioned into a post-tropical cyclone on the afternoon of August 7. The system never directly affect any land areas, though its remnants carried isolated rain showers to the San Francisco Bay Area a few days later.

Eugene's remnants also caused strong thunderstorms over southern California, causing strong winds and heavy rain. Flooding and landslides forced road closures. Damage throughout the state totaled to US$3,000.

=== Hurricane Fernanda ===
- Category 4 hurricane (SSHWS)
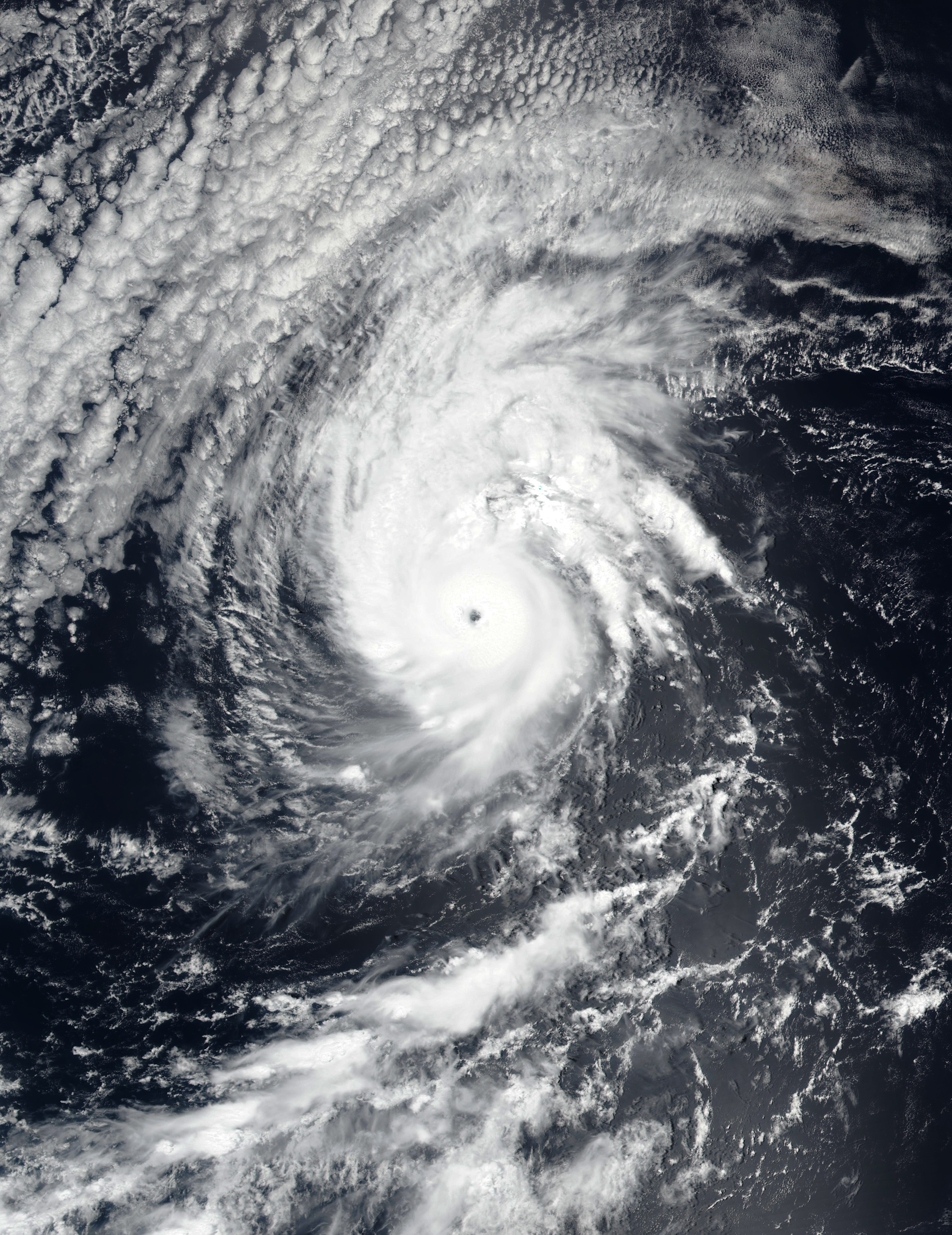
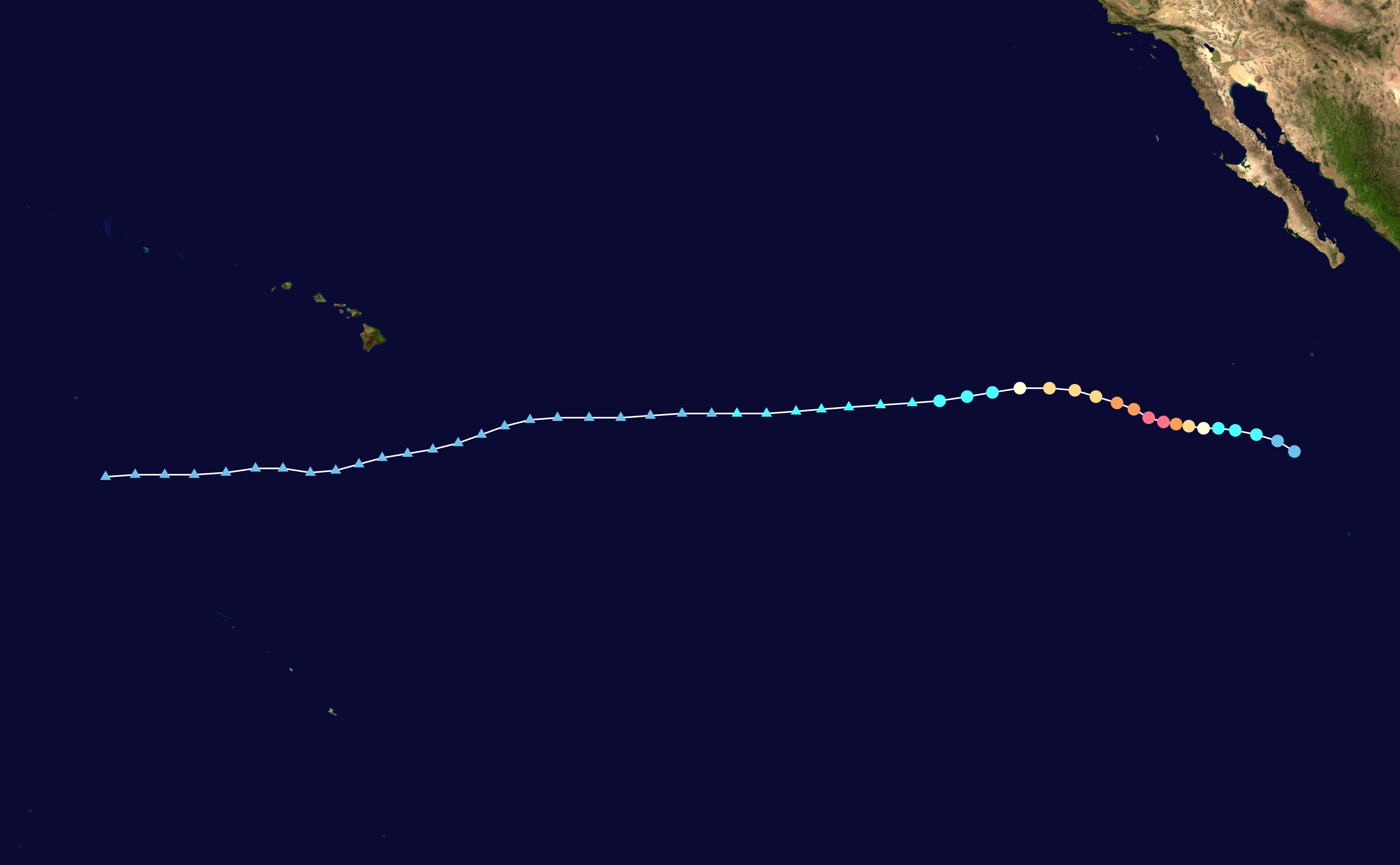
- Duration: August 12 – August 17
- Peak intensity: 130 mph (215 km/h) (1-min); 949 mbar (hPa)

On August 11, a broad area of low pressure associated with a tropical wave formed off the coast of southwestern Mexico. A well-defined center of circulation was observed within the disturbance on the afternoon of August 12, marking the formation of Tropical Depression Seven-E in the open ocean south-southwest of the Baja California peninsula. Later that same day, the steadily organizing system strengthened into Tropical Storm Fernanda. Into the next day, Fernanda followed a west-northwestward course, and was displaying signs that it was intensifying, including, very cold central dense overcast cloud tops of near −112 °F (−80 °C), and a well defined upper-level outflow over the western half of its circulation. When a faint eye-like feature became visible on satellite imagery that afternoon, the NHC upgraded the system to a Category 1 hurricane. Thus began a period of rapid intensification, during which it became a major hurricane. By 15:00 UTC on August 14, Fernanda had intensified to Category 4 strength, with sustained winds of 130 mph (215 km/h), and was moving toward the west at 8 mph (13 km/h) away from Baja California. Fernanda remained at that intensity for several hours, before falling to Category 3, while undergoing an apparent eyewall replacement cycle. The system continued to exhibit signs of weakening as the day progressed, and fell below major hurricane strength by day's end. The pace of structural degradation quickened on August 15, due to wind shear, cooling sea-surface temperatures, and low relative humidity levels. Fernanda became a tropical storm the following morning, and, by that evening, had become devoid of any convective activity. By then far west-southwest of Baja California, Fernanda became a post-tropical cyclone on the morning of August 17.

=== Tropical Storm Greg ===
- Tropical storm (SSHWS)
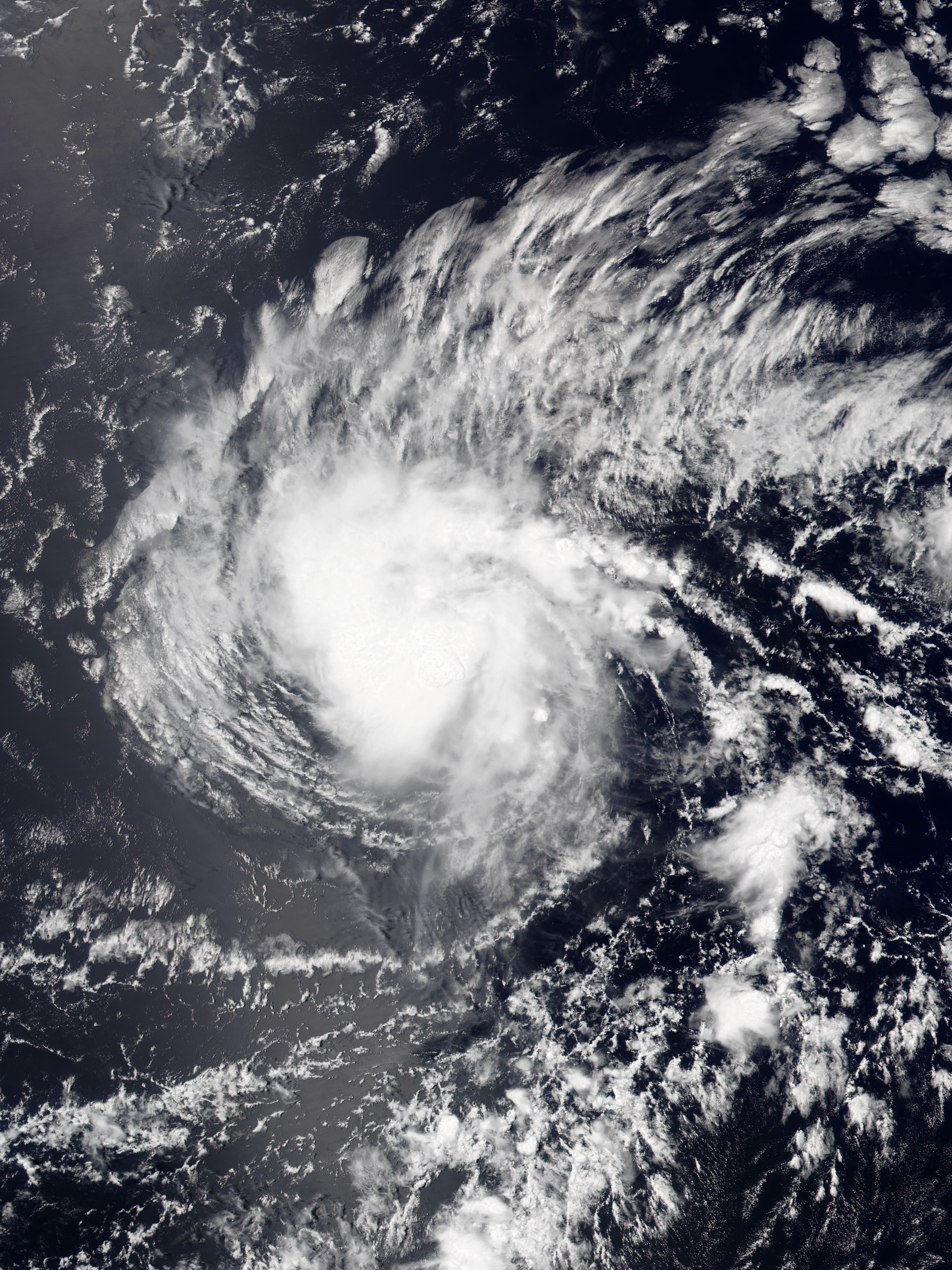
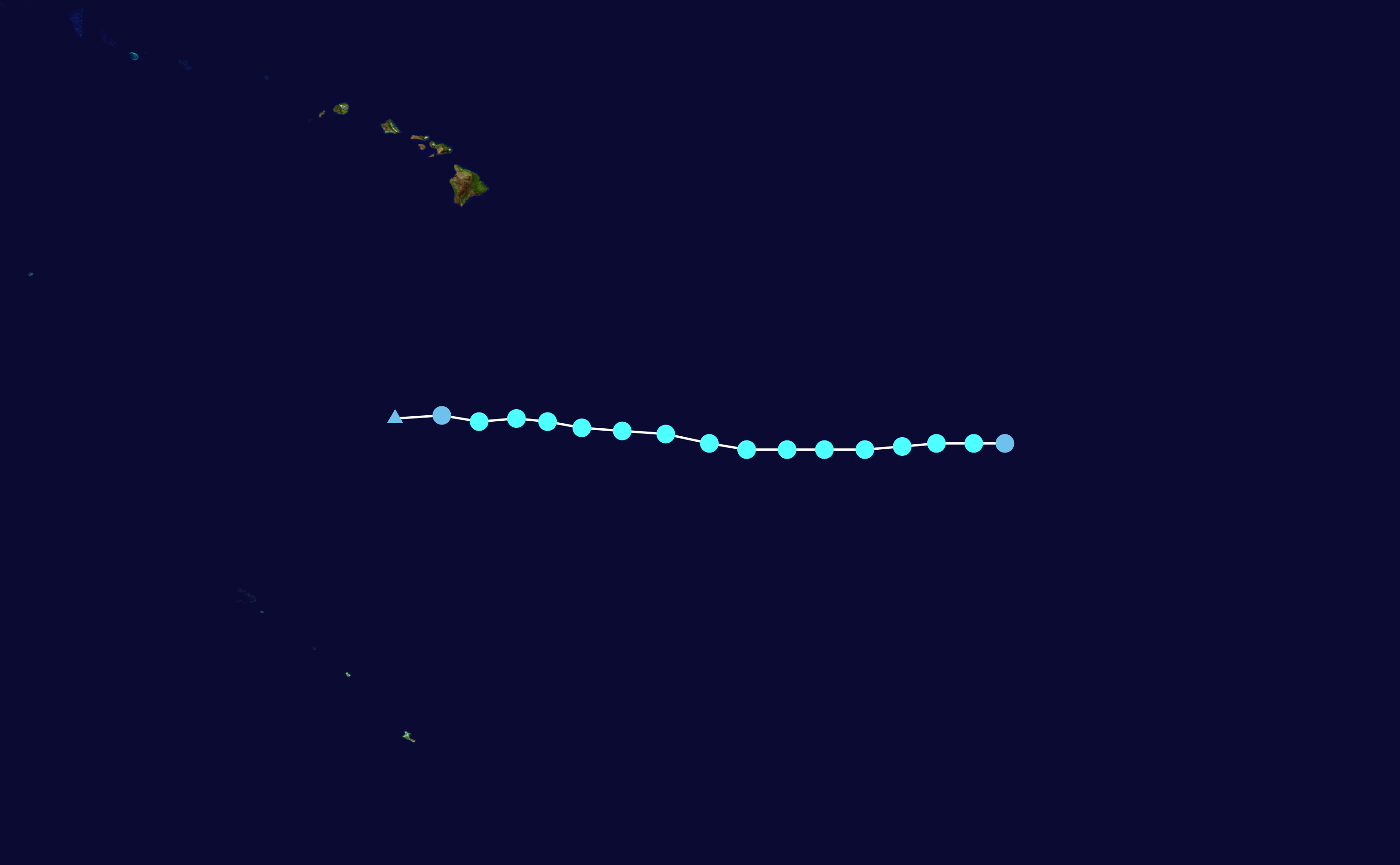
- Duration: August 14 – August 18
- Peak intensity: 65 mph (100 km/h) (1-min); 994 mbar (hPa)

On August 11, a broad area of low pressure associated with a tropical wave formed well to the east-southeast of the Hawaiian Islands. A few days later, shower and thunderstorm activity within the disturbance became better organized, and it developed a well-defined circulation. Consequently, Tropical Depression Eight‑E formed at 00:00 UTC on August 14. The depression strengthened into Tropical Storm Greg six hours later. At the time, the storm was moving westward at 13 mph (20 km/h), and was about to enter the Central Pacific basin. The storm strengthened some on August 15, as an inner core developed and deep convection increased near its center, a result of diminished wind shear and continued warm water temperatures. The wind shear, though relatively light, proved disruptive nonetheless, displacing Greg's convection to the north of the center and causing it to pulsate. This ultimately led to the system becoming increasingly disorganized late the following day. Later, while southeast of the Island of Hawaiʻi on August 18, it weakened to a tropical depression, and it dissipated later that day.

=== Hurricane Hilary ===
- Category 4 hurricane (SSHWS)
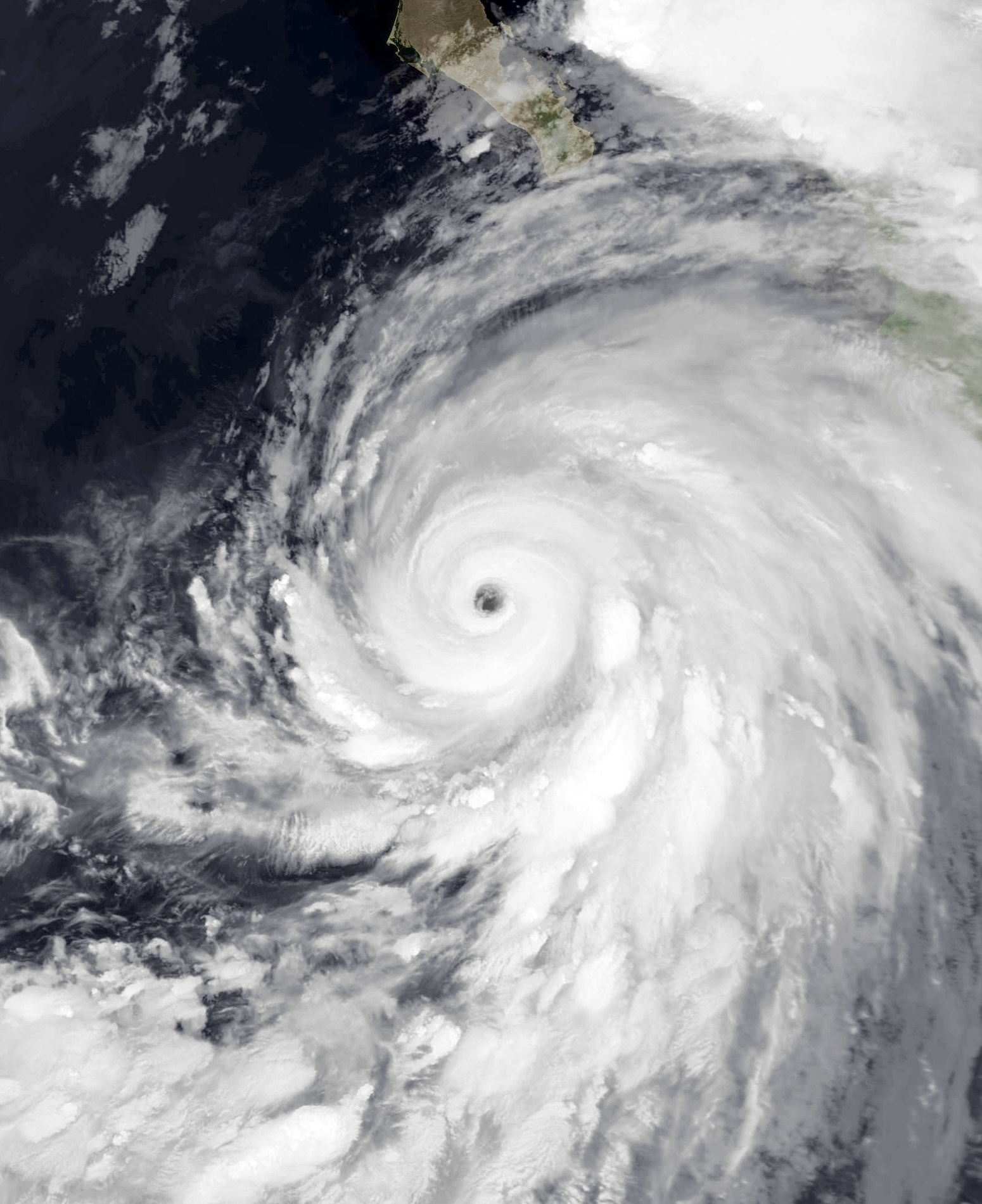
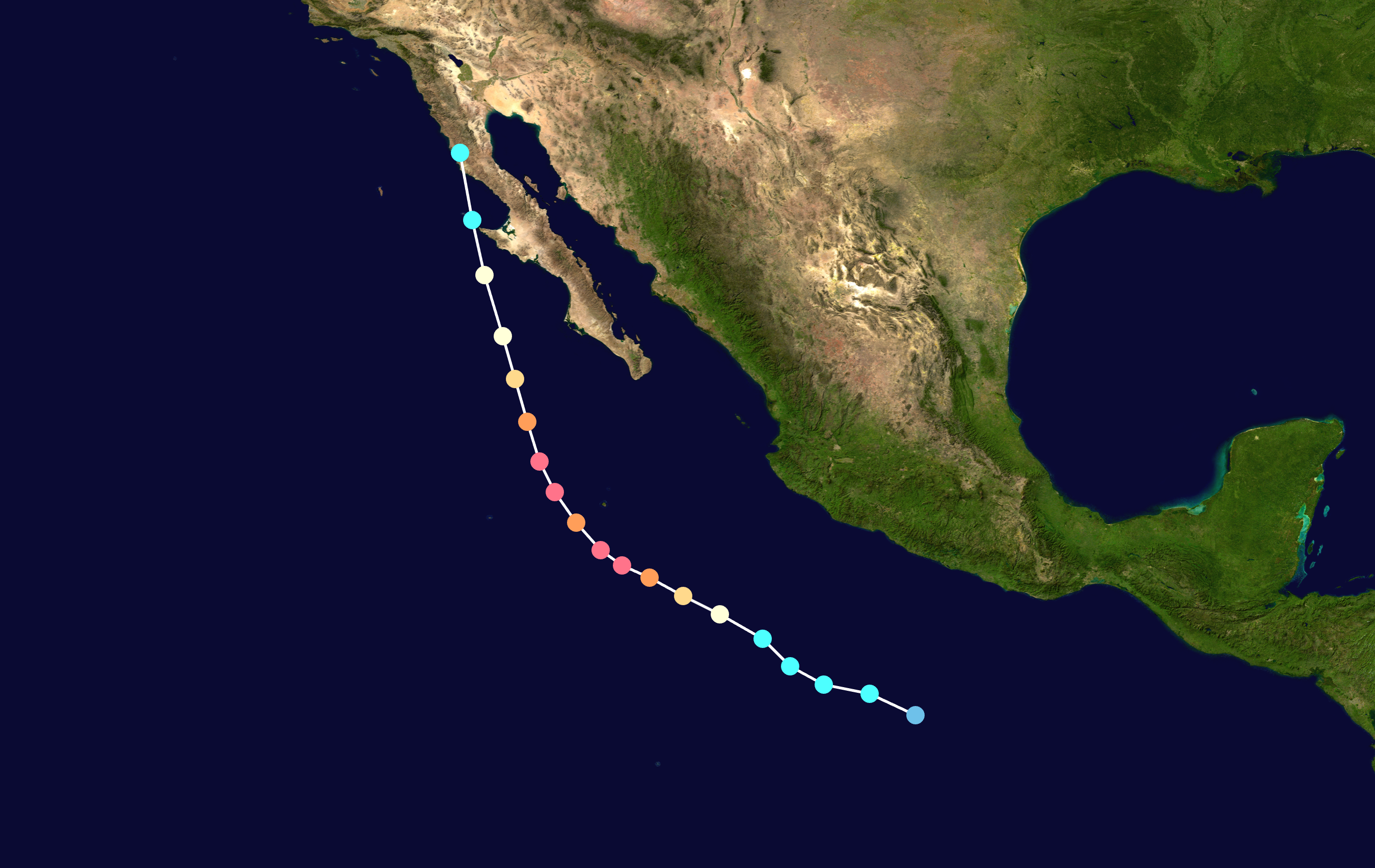
- Duration: August 16 – August 20
- Peak intensity: 140 mph (220 km/h) (1-min); 940 mbar (hPa)

On August 12, a tropical wave traversing Central America entered the far eastern Pacific, producing rain showers and thunderstorms. A broad area of low pressure developed within the wave on August 14, off the southern coasts of Mexico, Guatemala, and El Salvador. The disturbance gradually became better organized during the following day, and when a well-defined circulation along with developing convective banding features were observed on the morning of August 16, it was classified as Tropical Storm Hilary by the NHC. Hilary strengthened into a Category 1 hurricane at 12:00 UTC on August 17, while located about 320 mi (515 km) southwest of Manzanillo, Colima. It then proceeded to rapidly intensify, reaching peak intensity at Category 4 strength at 06:00 UTC on August 18 with sustained winds of 140 mph (220 km/h), an increase of 105 mph (165 km/h) over a 48‑hour period. As the steering influences of a trough of low pressure to its north near the California coast and a ridge of high pressure over the central United States began drawing Hilary north-northwestward on the morning of August 19, asymmetrical convective patterns developed as the deep convection on the west side of the system was being eroded by an intrusion of dry and stable air. This caused the hurricane to weaken to Category 3 strength, with winds of 125 mph (205 km/h). By the end of that day, the hurricane had fallen to Category 1 intensity as a result of the adverse effects of cooler waters, drier air, and increasing shear. Then, after weakening to a tropical storm, Hilary made landfall in San Quintín, Baja California, about 215 mi (345 km) south-southeast of San Diego, California, at around 18:00 UTC on August 20, with winds of 65 mph (105 km/h). The storm continued to move north-northwestward after landfall, and crossed into California about six hours later, south-southwest of Palm Springs. On the morning of August 21, while moving over southern California and Nevada, Hilary lost all tropical characteristics, becoming a post-tropical cyclone.

Two fatalities, both in Mexico, have been linked to Hilary. Additionally, the storm left behind flooded roads, mudslides and downed trees in the Baja California peninsula and in Southern California. Even so, its overall impact on the region was less severe than anticipated.

=== Tropical Storm Irwin ===
- Tropical storm (SSHWS)
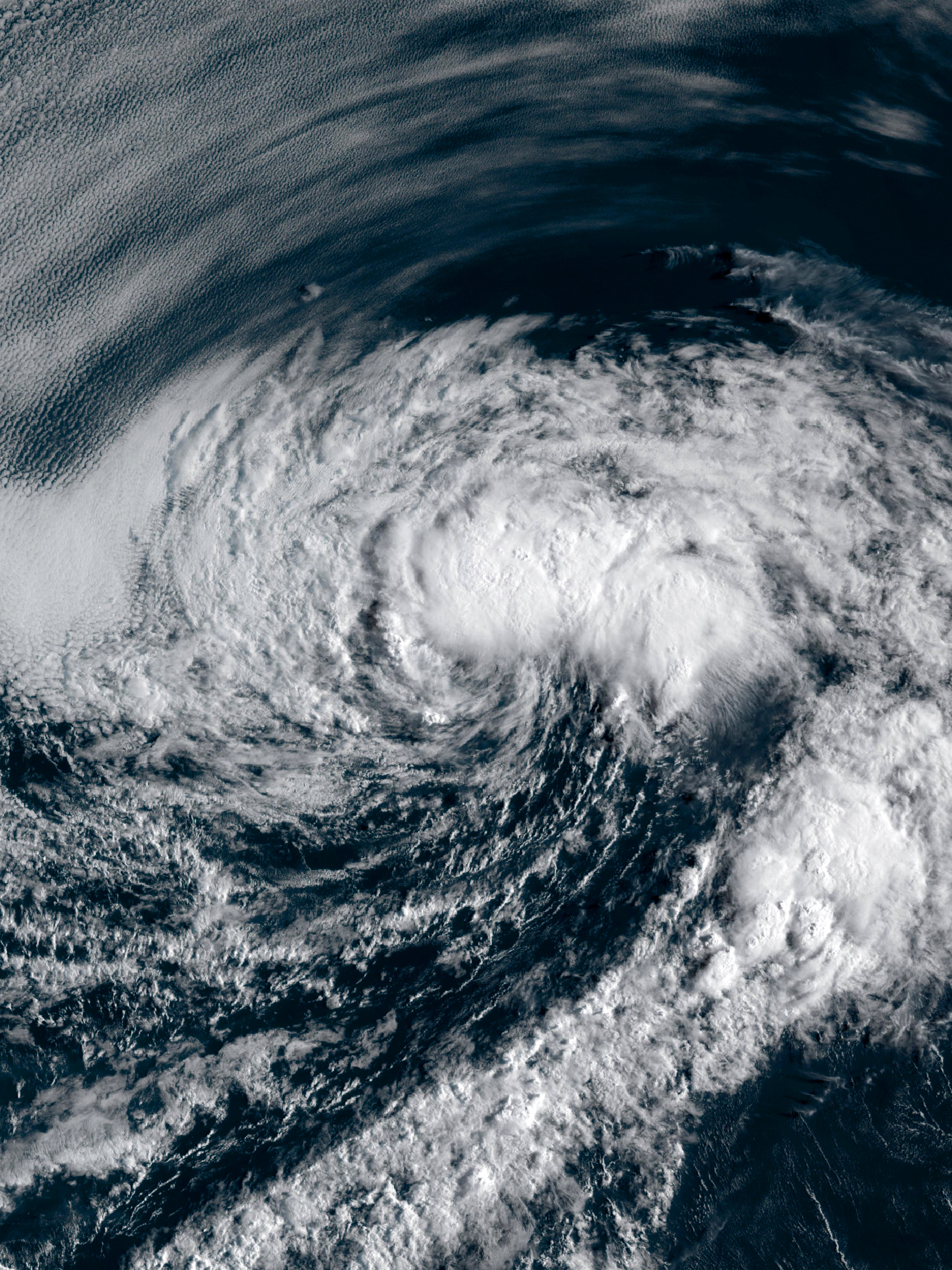
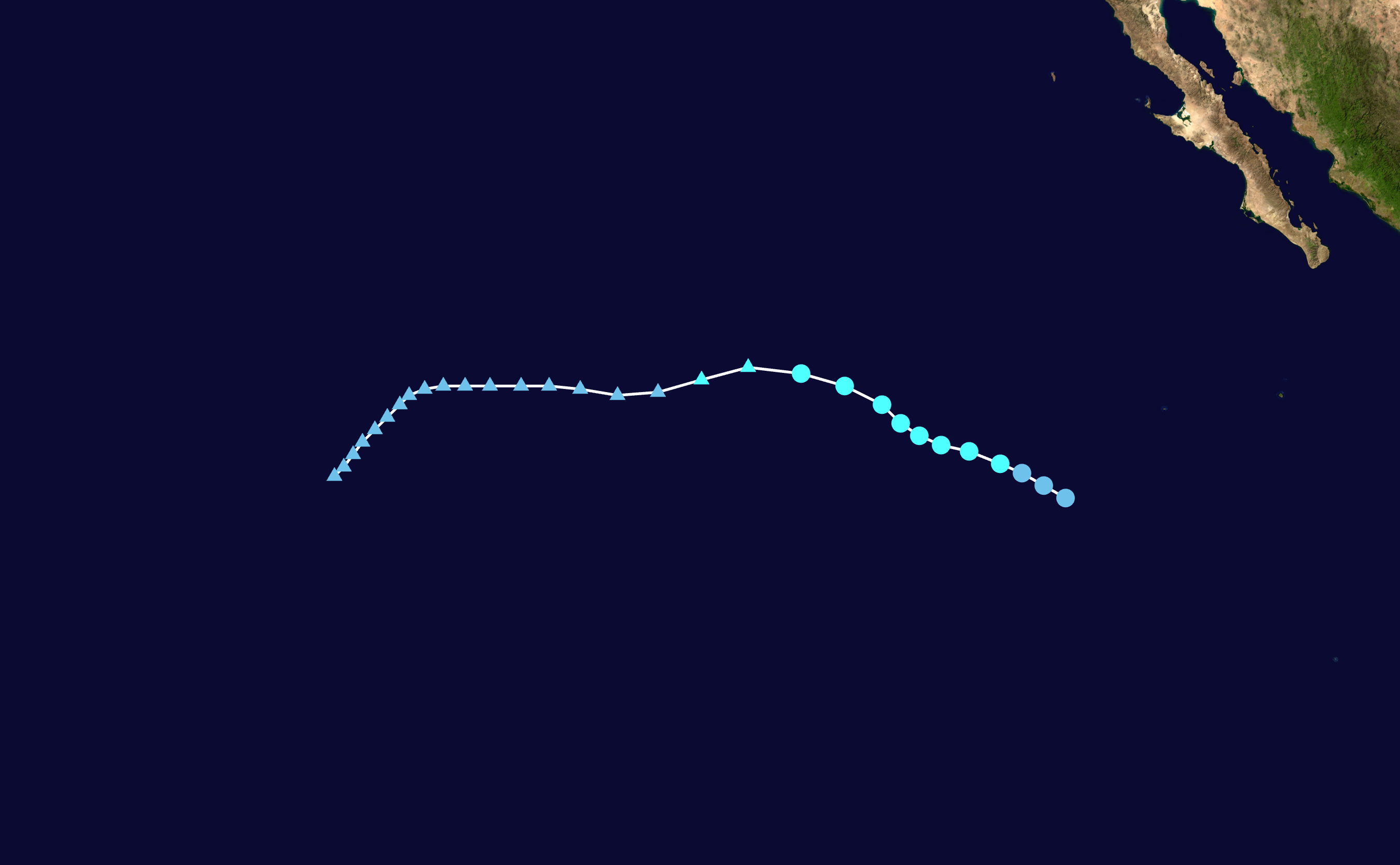
- Duration: August 26 – August 29
- Peak intensity: 45 mph (75 km/h) (1-min); 998 mbar (hPa)

On August 23, a trough of low pressure formed far to the south of the Baja California peninsula. Late on August 26, the disturbance organized, becoming Tropical Depression Ten-E. Amid marginally favorable conditions, the system was able to strengthen, becoming Tropical Storm Irwin twelve hours later. Irwin remained a poorly organized storm, struggling to generate sustained convection in account of increasingly cooler water temperatures and low relative humidity. Consequently, it degenerated to a post-tropical cyclone on August 29.

=== Hurricane Jova ===
- Category 5 hurricane (SSHWS)
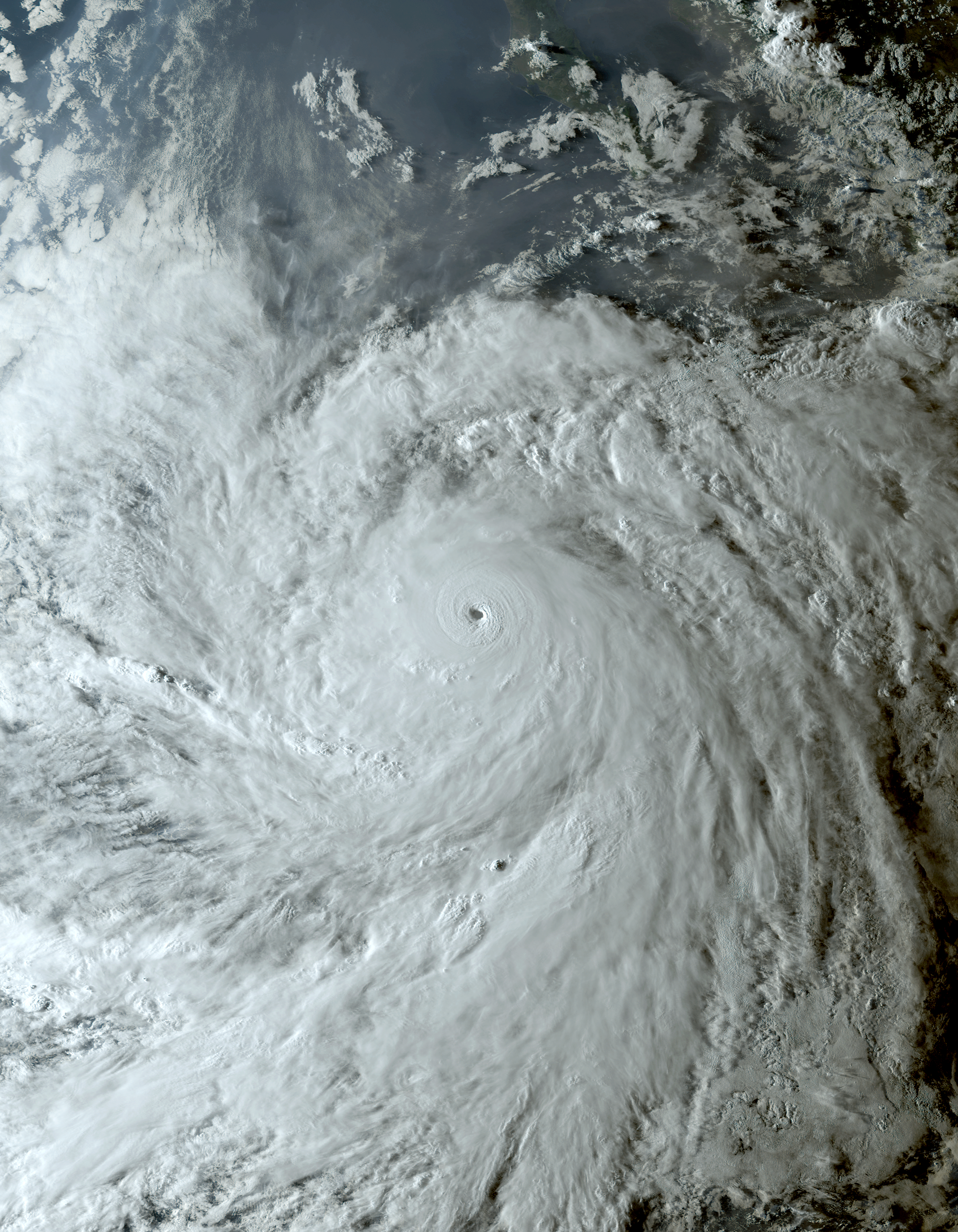
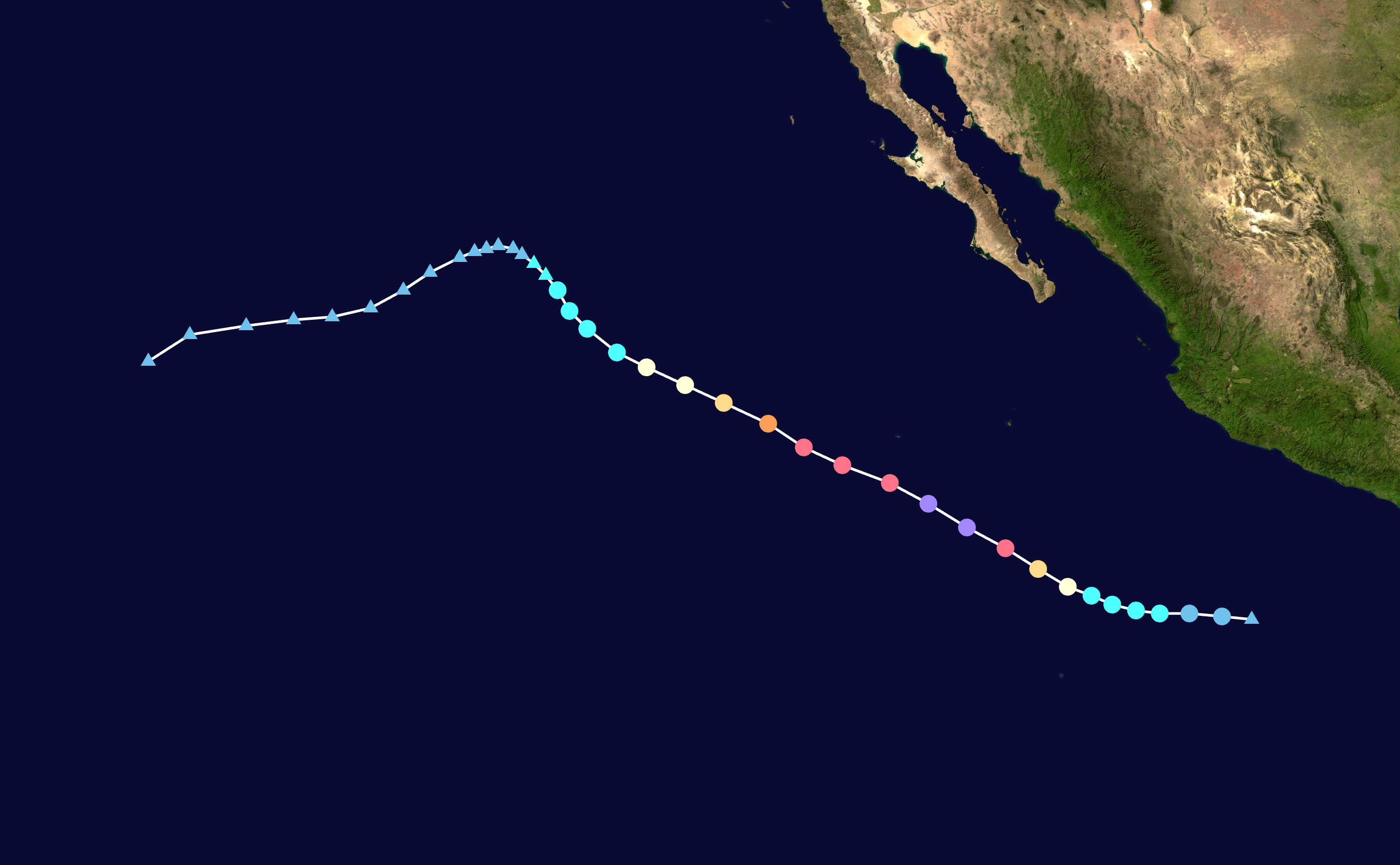
- Duration: September 4 – September 10
- Peak intensity: 160 mph (260 km/h) (1-min); 926 mbar (hPa)

On September 1, a tropical wave emerged over the far eastern Pacific south of the coasts of El Salvador and Guatemala. A broad area of low pressure formed within it two days later south of the southwestern coast of Mexico. The low became more organized on September 4, a well-defined circulation developed, and a distinct band of deep convection formed around its western half. The NHC classified the system as Tropical Depression Eleven‑E at 21:00 UTC. The depression strengthened into Tropical Storm Jova early on September 5, far to the south-southwest of Cabo San Lucas, Baja California Sur. There, Jova underwent a burst of rapid intensification in which it went from a 70 mph (110 km/h) tropical storm to a 160 mph (260 km/h) Category 5 hurricane in a 24‑hour period ending at 03:00 UTC on September 7, an increase of 90 mph (150 km/h). Later that day, Jova started an eyewall replacement cycle, starting a weakening trend. The weakening trend continued into September 8, as Jova moved into waters below 79 °F (26 °C), and by that afternoon its winds had decreased to Category 1 hurricane strength. Jova weakened to a tropical storm early on September 9, as persistent dry air intrusion resulted in diminished deep convection and deterioration of the convective banding around the system. Subsequently, all deep convection within the storm ceased and its overall cloud pattern became increasingly unorganized during the morning of September 10. Consequently, Jova degenerated into a post-tropical remnant low with 35 mph (55 km/h) winds later that day. It then meandered westward before opening up into a trough on September 12.

=== Tropical Depression Twelve-E ===
- Tropical depression (SSHWS)
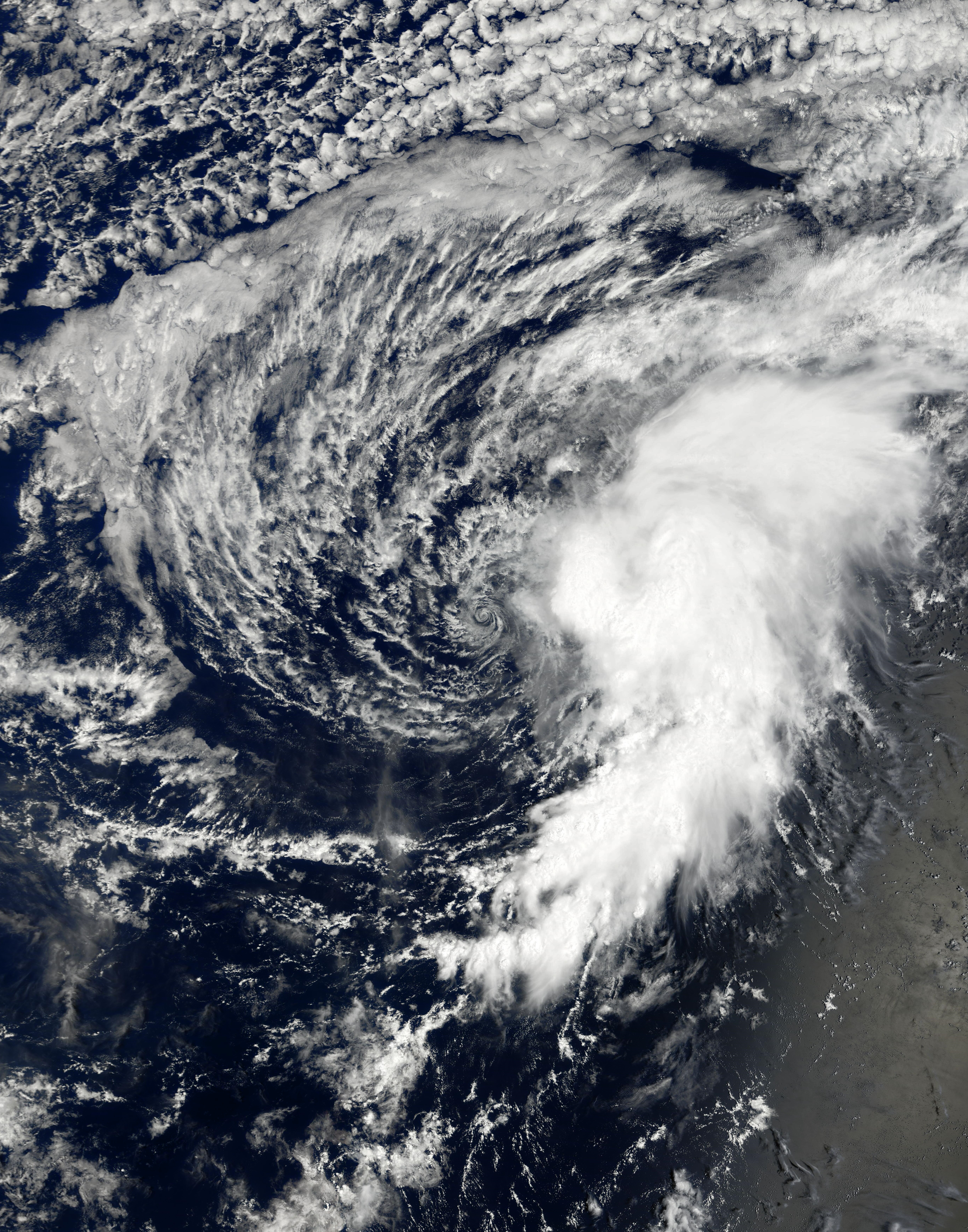
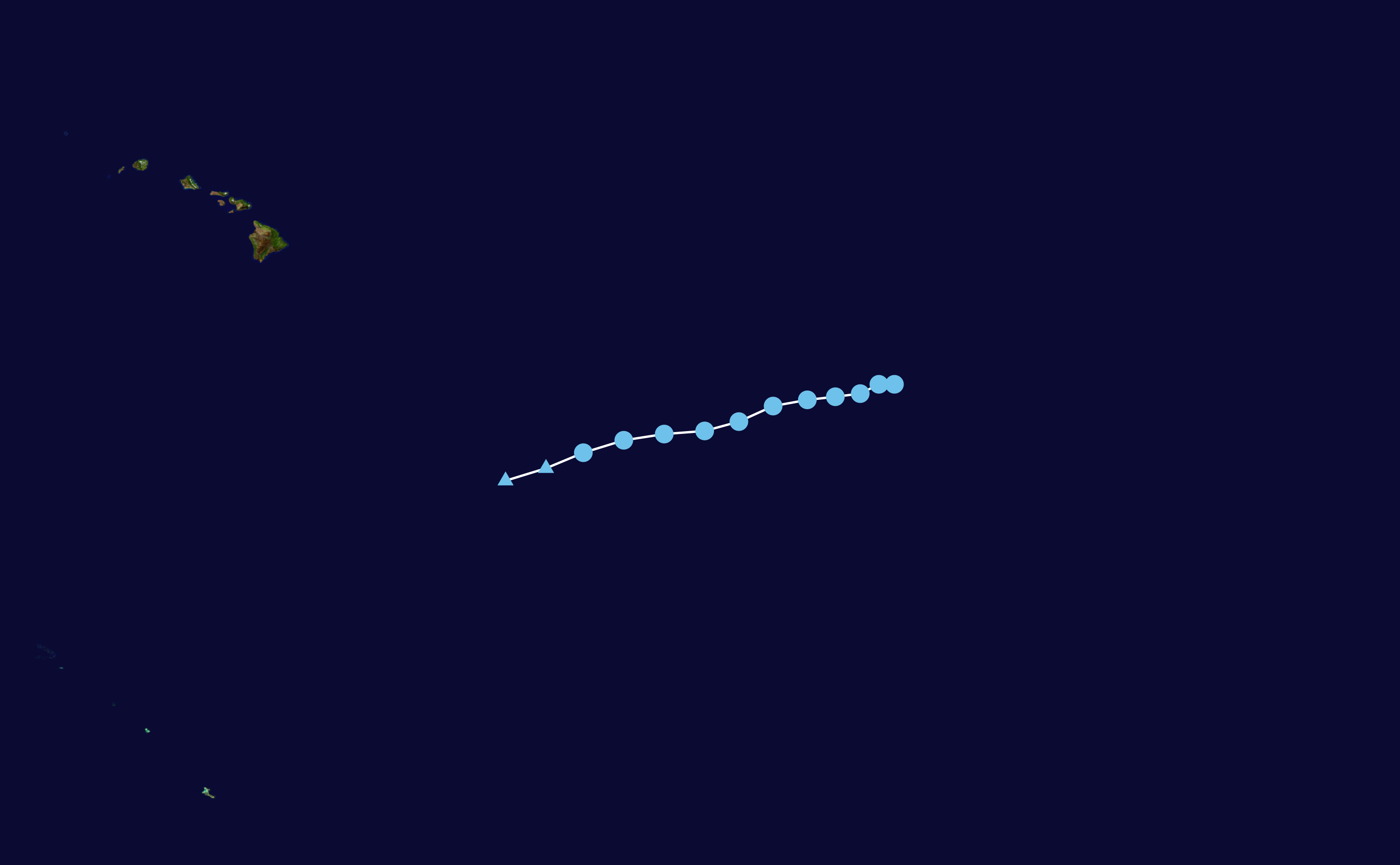
- Duration: September 15 – September 18
- Peak intensity: 35 mph (55 km/h) (1-min); 1006 mbar (hPa)

On September 11, the NHC began monitoring a disorganized area of showers and thunderstorms associated with a tropical wave far southwest of the Baja California peninsula, that initially left the west coast of Africa two weeks earlier on August 26. On September 12, a broad area of low pressure formed, which began showing some signs of organization the following day. These trends continued, as the deep convection around the developing center of the disturbance became persistent and sufficiently organized on the morning of September 15, for the system to be classified as Tropical Depression Twelve‑E. The depression struggled to produce persistent deep convection during the hours after its formation due to moderate westerly wind shear. Its structure degraded the following morning, and persistent deep convection ceased, resulting in the system degenerating into a post tropical remnant low early on September 18. The storm's remnants continued to the southwest and dissipated later that day.

=== Tropical Storm Kenneth ===
- Tropical storm (SSHWS)
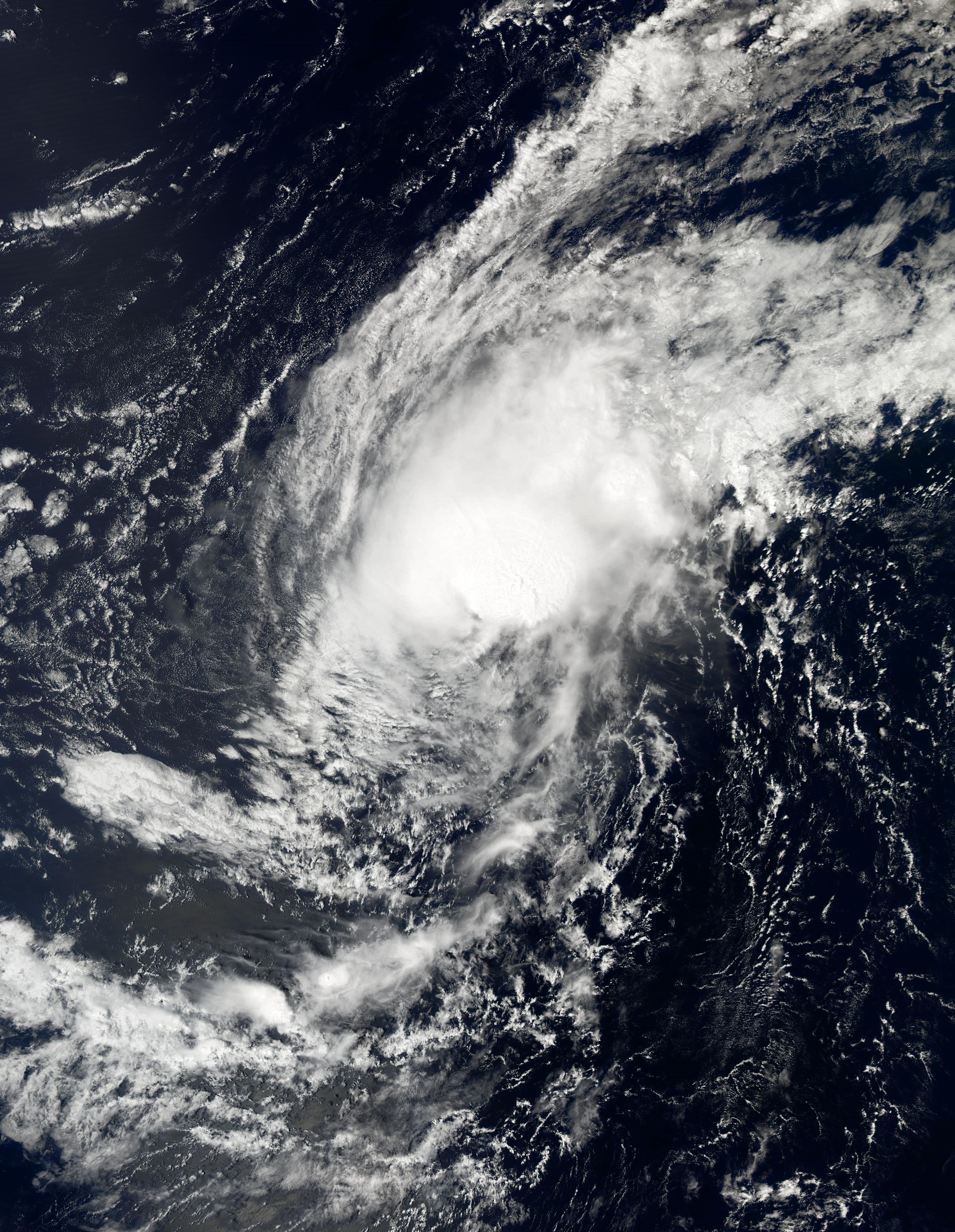
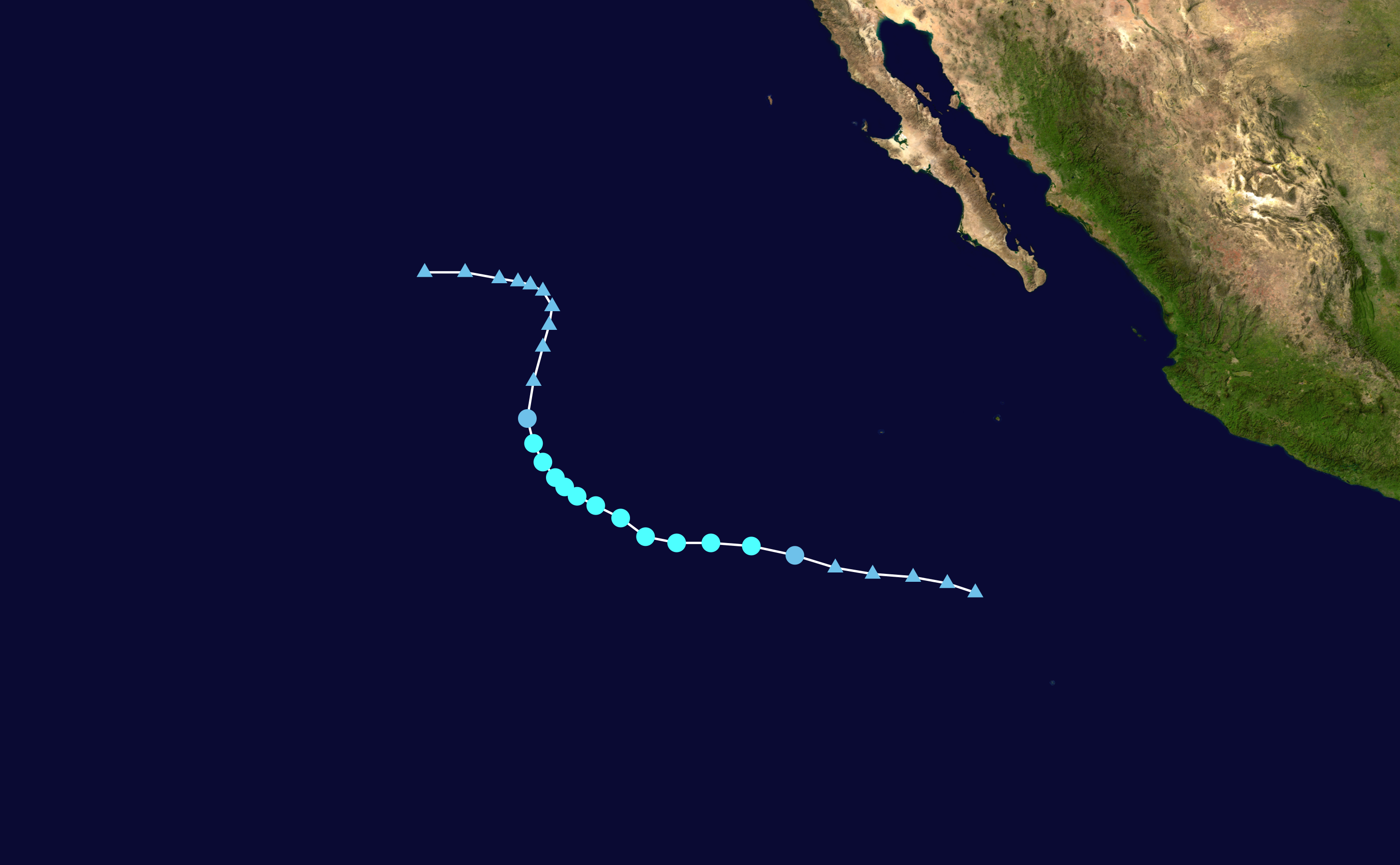
- Duration: September 19 – September 22
- Peak intensity: 50 mph (85 km/h) (1-min); 1000 mbar (hPa)

On September 16, the NHC began monitoring a newly formed area of disturbed weather far south of the coast of southern Mexico. Showers and thunderstorms within the low pressure area became more persistent over the ensuing couple days, and better organized by the morning of September 19, resulting in the formation of Tropical Depression Thirteen‑E. Moving west that afternoon amid warm sea surface temperatures and favorable atmospheric conditions, the depression was able to strengthen somewhat, and became Tropical Storm Kenneth. Moderate easterly wind shear plagued the system as it continued westward. Despite this, Kenneth was able to become better organized and strengthen slightly, reach its peak intensity on September 20 with maximum sustained winds of 50 mph (80 km/h). After maintaining its strength for another day, Kenneth began to weaken on September 21 in the face of increasing southwesterly vertical wind shear, causing the storm's convection to wane. Early on September 22, Kenneth weakened to a tropical depression and degenerated to a remnant low six hours later.

=== Tropical Depression Fourteen-E ===
- Tropical depression (SSHWS)
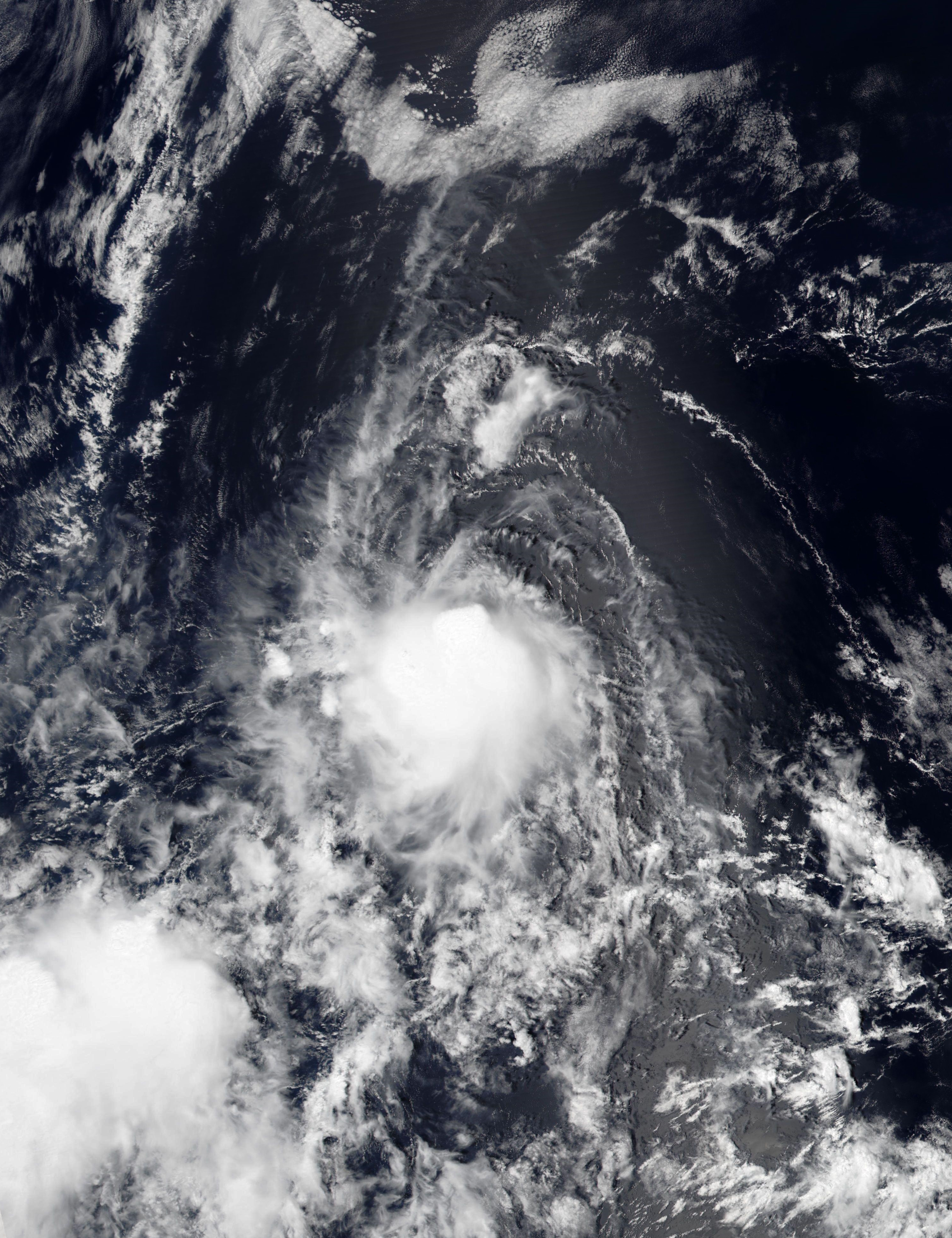
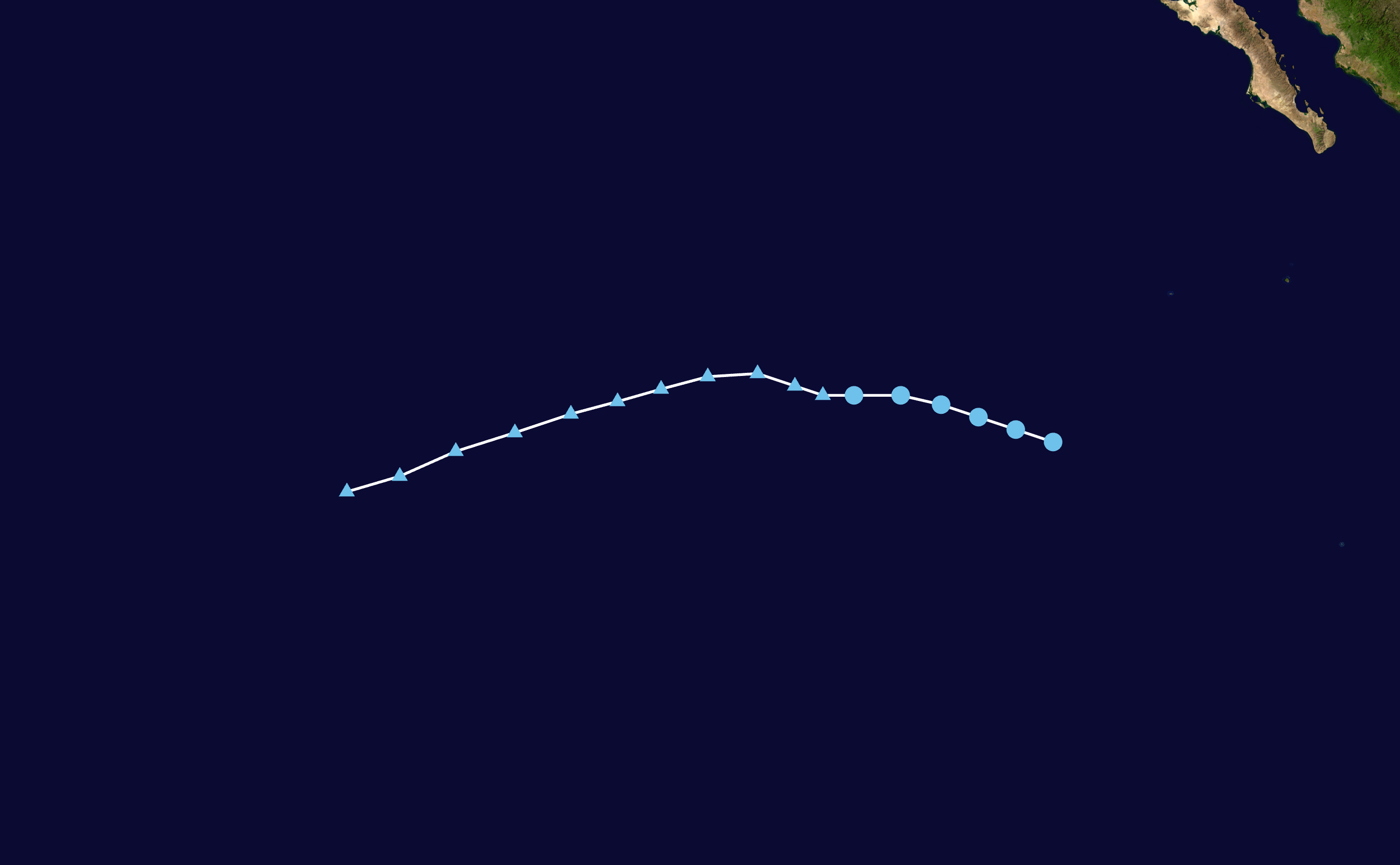
- Duration: September 23 – September 24
- Peak intensity: 35 mph (55 km/h) (1-min); 1006 mbar (hPa)

On September 20, a trough of low pressure formed far south of the southwestern coast of Mexico. Two days later, its showers and thunderstorms began to show signs of organization. The disturbance rapidly became better organized on the morning of September 23, with a marked band of deep convection and very well-defined surface circulation signifying the formation of Tropical Depression Fourteen-E. The depression did not become better organized after formation, as deep convection became erratic near the center and the convective band became indistinguishable by late in the day. Fourteen-E continued to weaken in a fairly hostile environment, characterized by dry air and moderate wind shear, and it degenerated to a remnant low by 00:00 UTC on September 25.

=== Hurricane Lidia ===
- Category 4 hurricane (SSHWS)
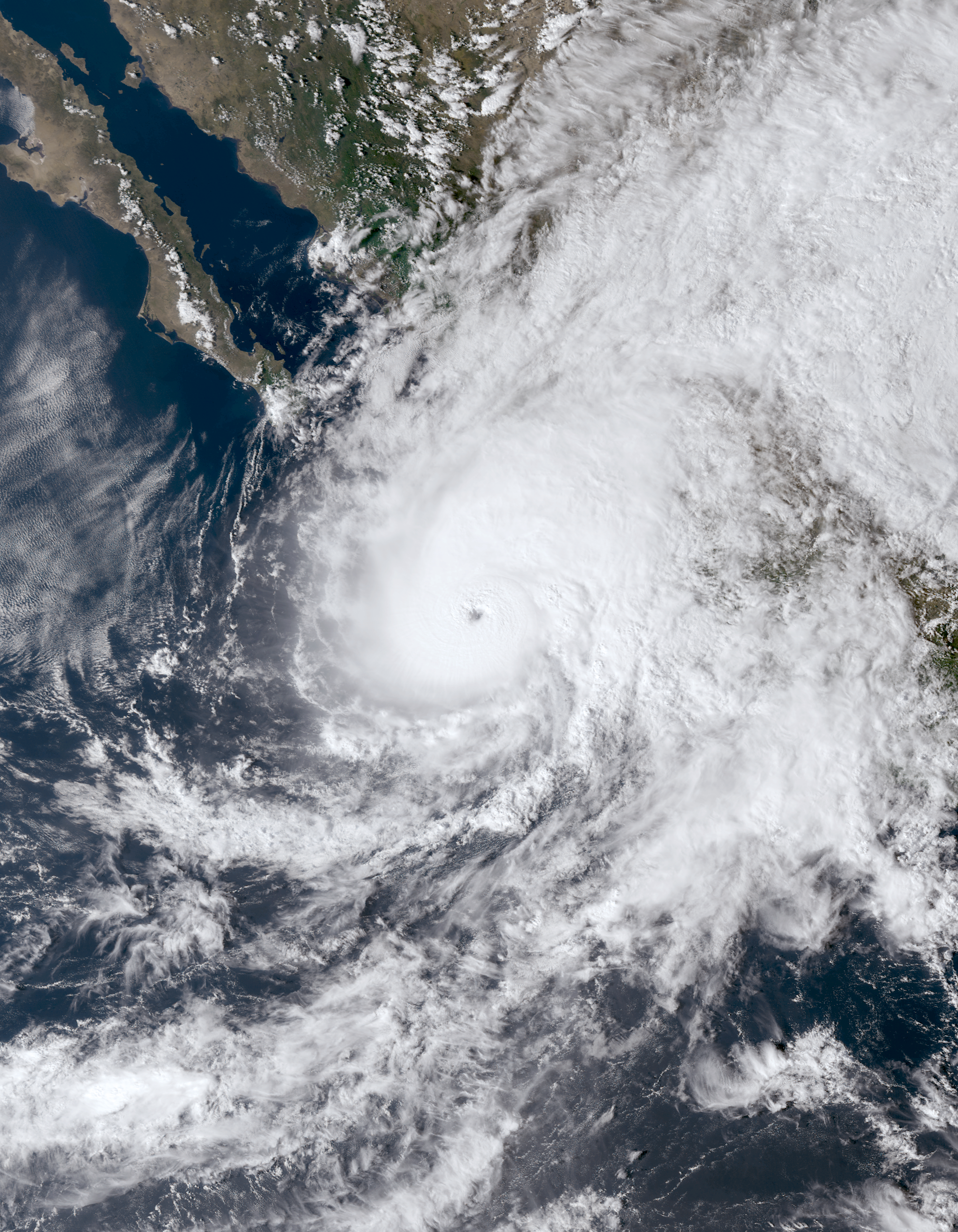
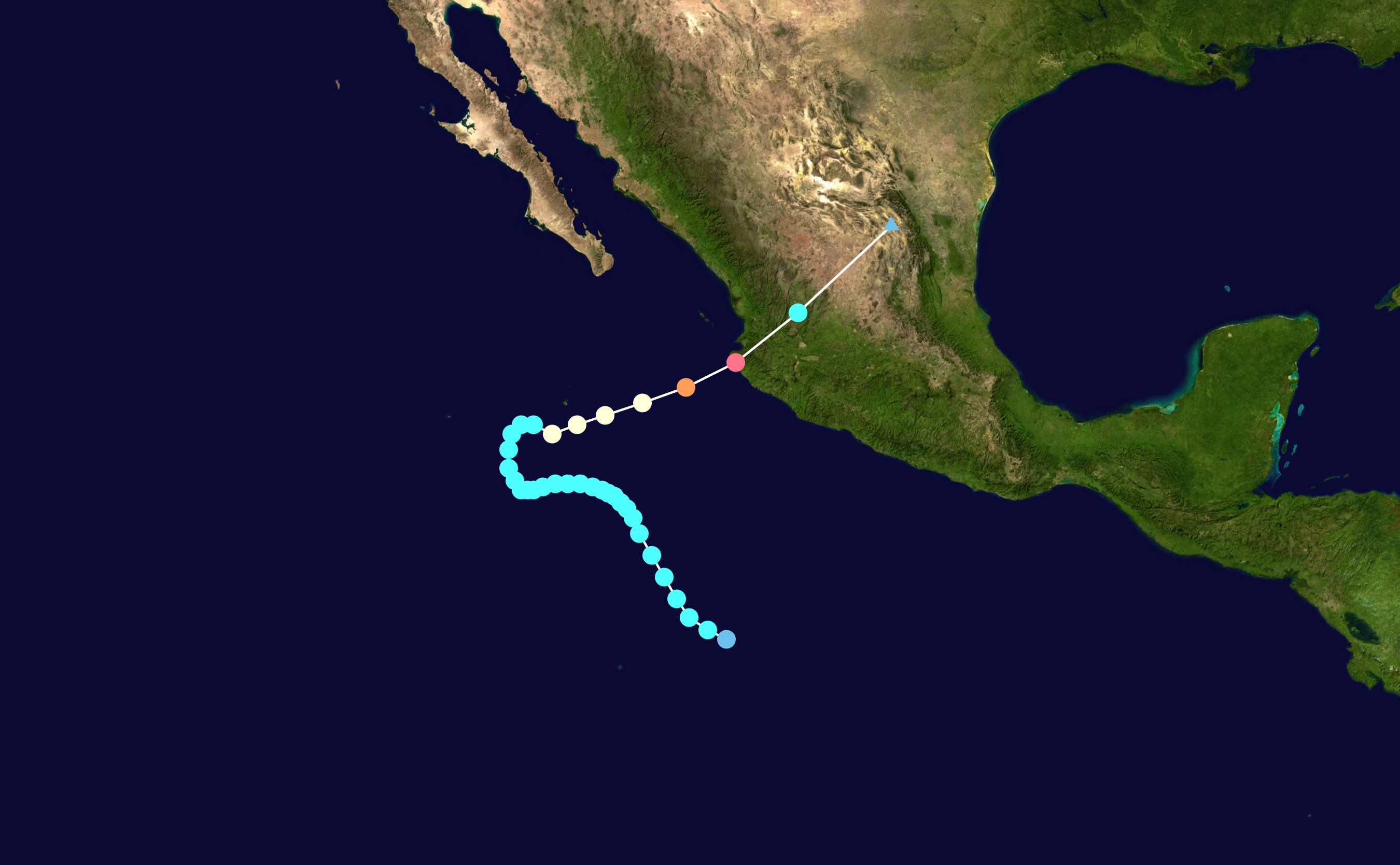
- Duration: October 3 – October 11
- Peak intensity: 140 mph (220 km/h) (1-min); 942 mbar (hPa)

On October 1, a large area of persistent showers and thunderstorms being produced by a tropical wave located south of the coast of southern and southwestern Mexico became increasingly concentrated around a developing area of low pressure. The low-pressure area further organized, with satellite and scatterometer data later showing the system had developed a well-defined closed circulation and was producing tropical storm-force winds. On October 3, it was designated as Tropical Storm Lidia. The storm tracked west-northwestward for the next few days, gradually strengthening along the way. Even though Lidia became a little stronger, the most intense deep convection was limited to the western part of the system's circulation on account of persistent easterly wind shear. The system meandered generally north-northwestward on October 7, then northward the following day, while it rounded the western edge of a subtropical ridge. Next, the storm made a turn to the northeast during the early hours of October 9. Later, as environmental conditions became increasingly conducive for strengthening, Lidia explosively intensified to Category 4 strength by 21:30 UTC the next day, and accelerated, while being steered to the east-northeast by a nearby mid- to upper-level trough. Lidia then made landfall around 23:50 UTC, with sustained winds of 140 mph (220 km/h), about 15 mi (25 km) south-southeast of Cabo Corrientes, Jalisco. Lidia's structure rapidly deteriorated inland, dissipating several hours later as it moved over the Sierra Madre Occidental.

One person was killed north of Puerto Vallarta after strong winds caused by Lidia downed a tree on a van, and two others were injured in Autlán de Navarro and Cihuatlán in Jalisco. Numerous trees were uprooted and flooding occurred, with floodwaters inundating a hospital and vehicles, leaving several people stranded. Jalisco's governor, Enrique Alfaro, estimated that Lidia caused losses worth MXN$1.4 billion (US$77.56 million) in the state. Damage in Colima totaled to Mex$6.2 million (US$337,000). Damage in Nayarit totaled to Mex$900,000 (US$49,000).

=== Tropical Storm Max ===
- Tropical storm (SSHWS)
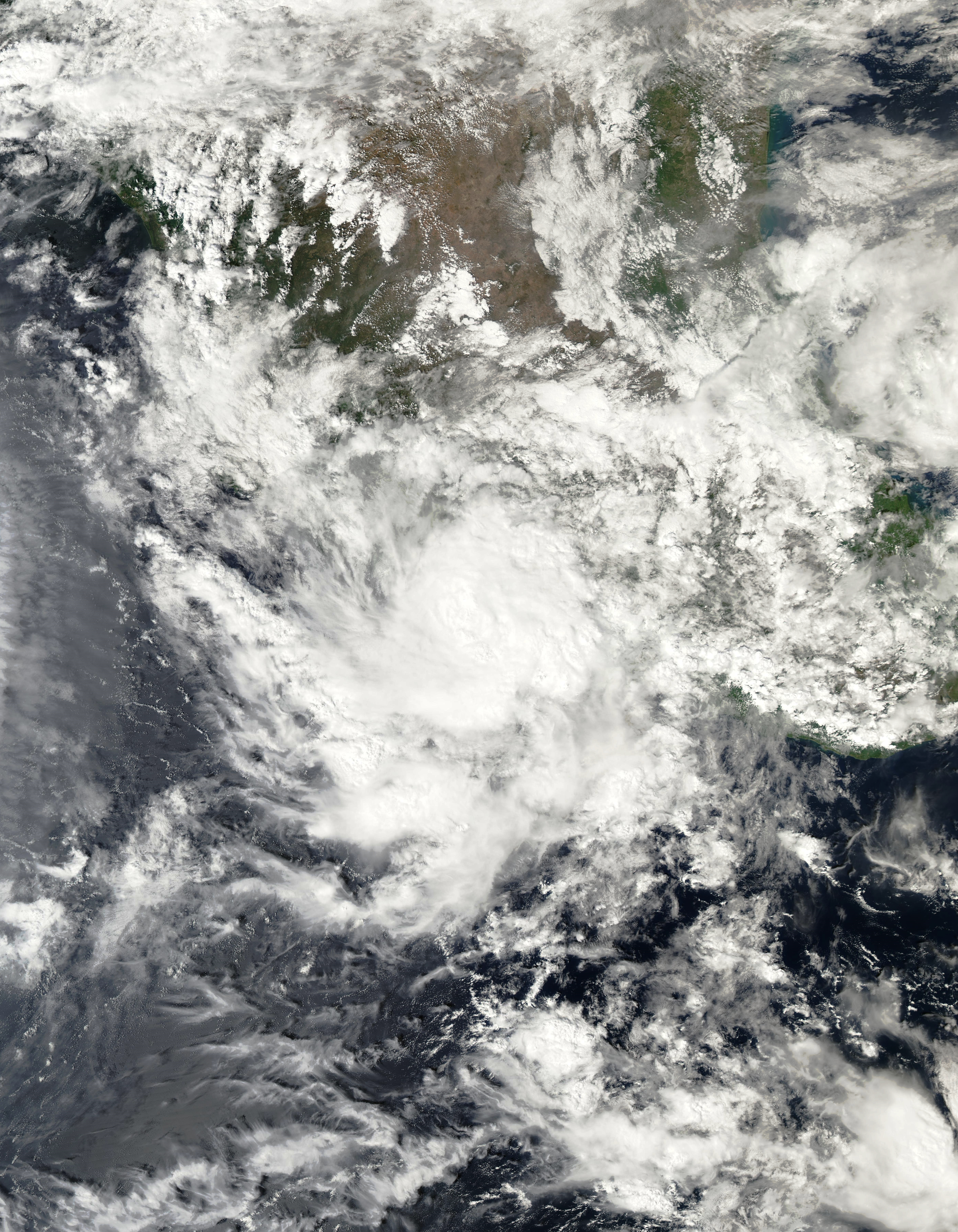
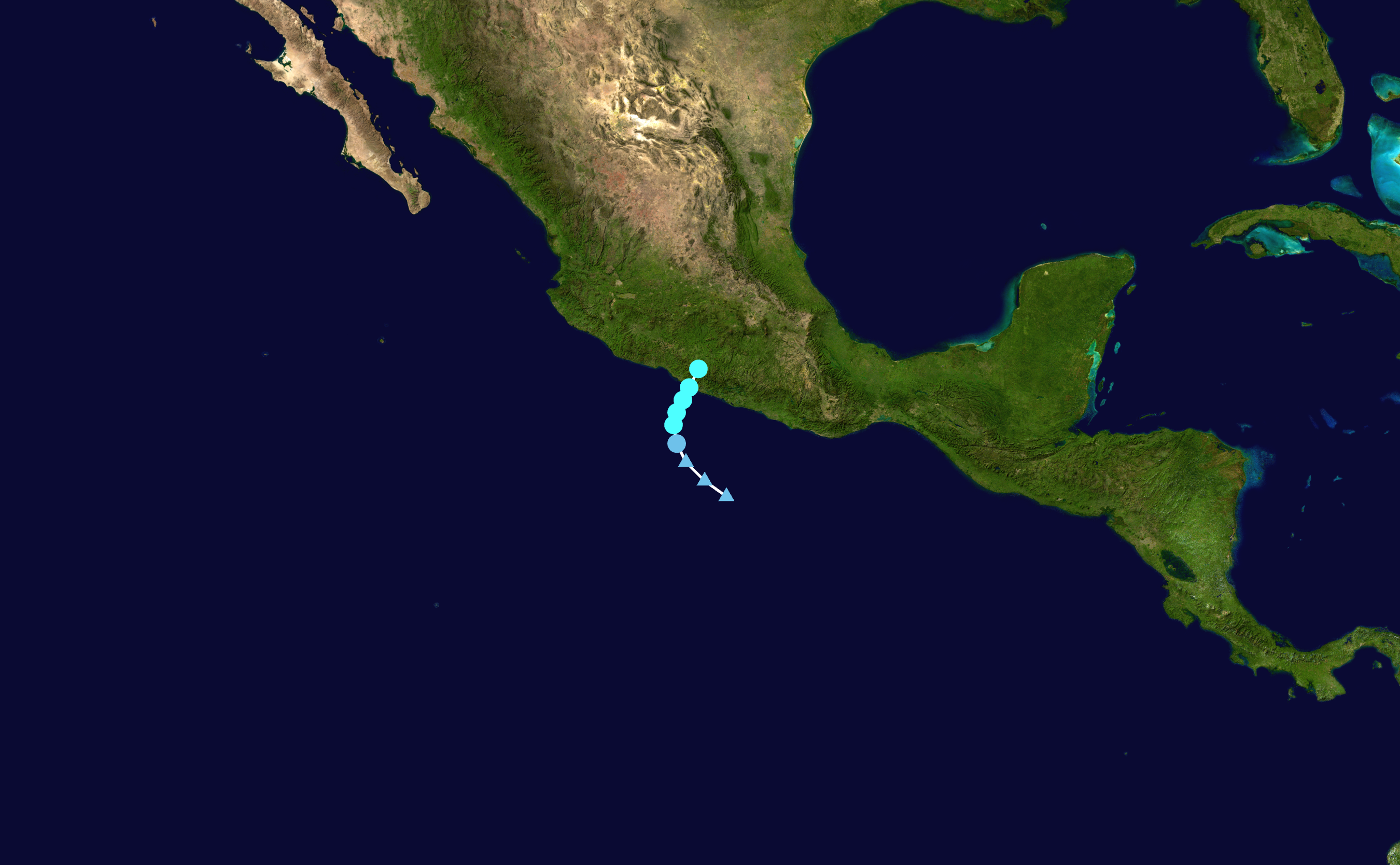
- Duration: October 8 – October 10
- Peak intensity: 70 mph (110 km/h) (1-min); 990 mbar (hPa)

On October 3, a trough of low pressure formed south of Central America. Showers and thunderstorms associated with the disturbance gradually became better organized over the next few days. And, as it moved closer to Acapulco on October 7, the NHC initiated advisories on the developing storm, designating it Potential Tropical Cyclone Sixteen‑E. By the following afternoon, the disturbance had developed a well-defined circulation, and was reclassified as a tropical depression. Then, by late evening on October 8, the system strengthened into Tropical Storm Max. Max moved to the north-northeast and strengthened some on October 9, prior to making landfall around 18:00 UTC with winds of 65 mph (100 km/h) just west of Puerto Vicente Guerrero, Técpan de Galeana, Guerrero. Once inland, Max's center of circulation become increasingly ill-defined, and the system dissipated early the next morning over the high mountains.

At least two people were killed and two others were injured in Guerrero. Total losses in Guerrero reached at least Mex$702 million (US$38.6 million).

=== Hurricane Norma ===
- Category 4 hurricane (SSHWS)
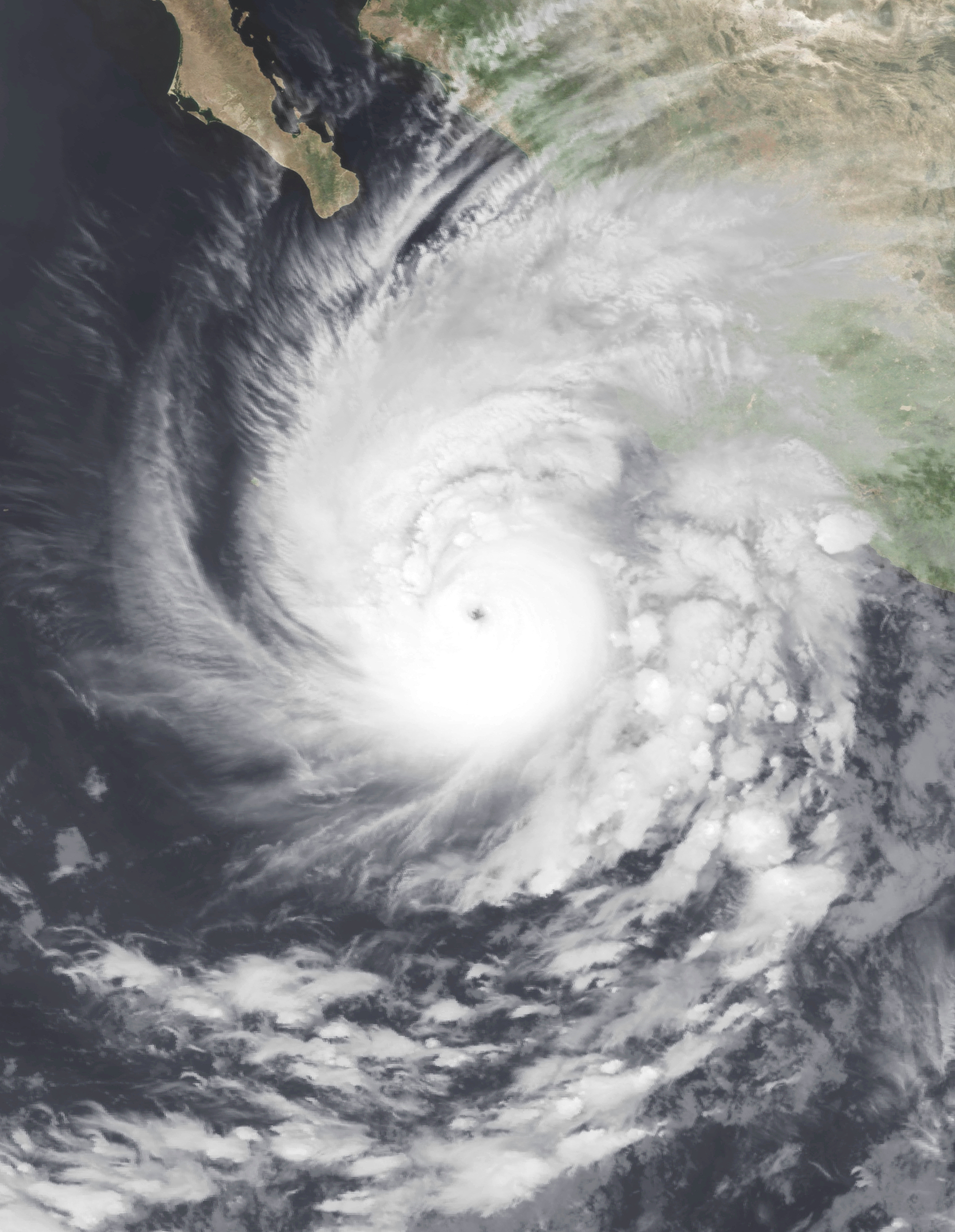
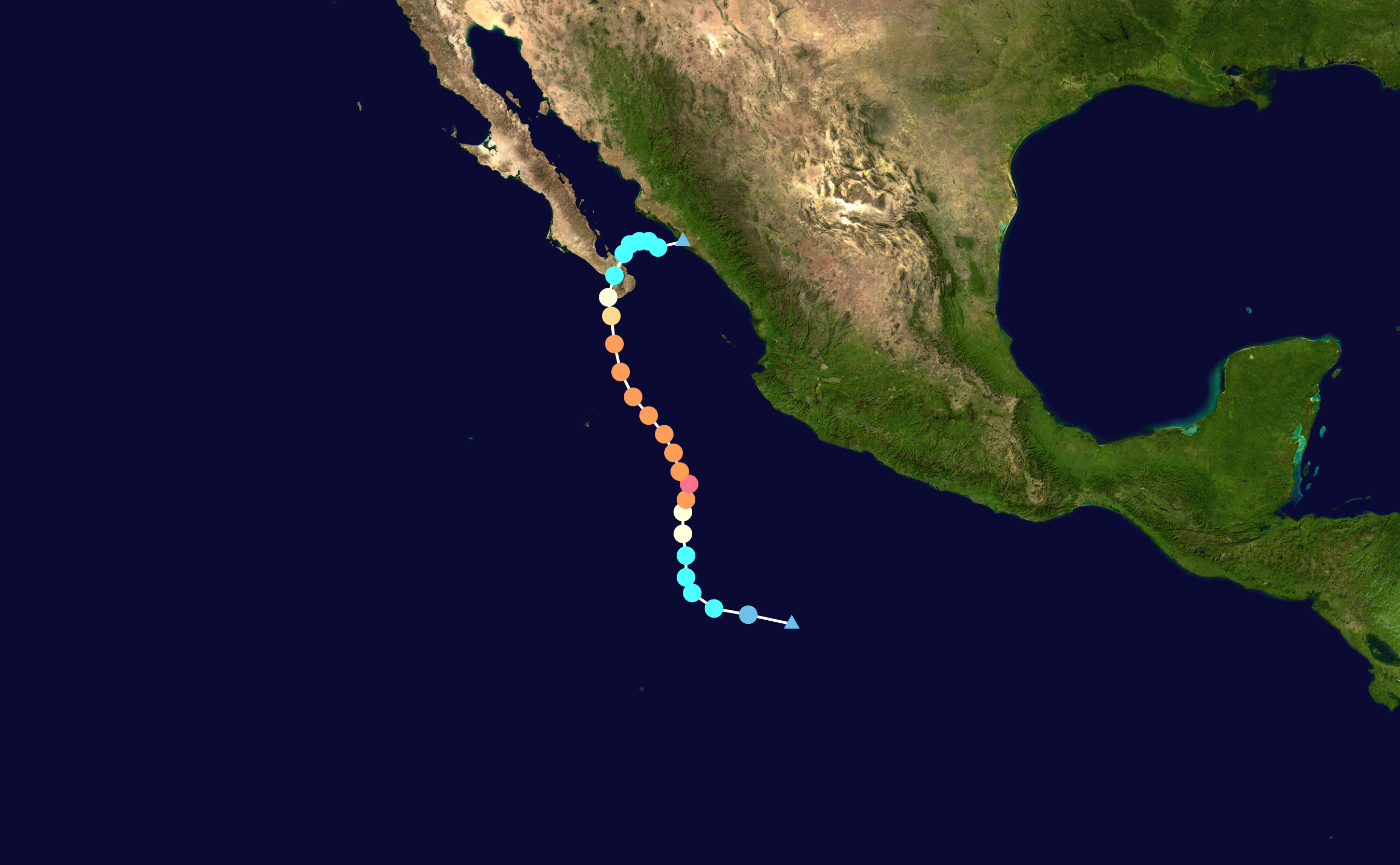
- Duration: October 17 – October 23
- Peak intensity: 130 mph (215 km/h) (1-min); 939 mbar (hPa)

A tropical depression formed on October 17 off the southwest coast of Mexico, which quickly strengthened into Tropical Storm Norma. With warm waters and low wind shear, Norma steadily intensified as it moved generally northward. It attained hurricane status late on October 18, and subsequently rapidly intensified. On the next day, Norma attained peak winds of 130 mph (215 km/h), with a minimum pressure of 939 mbar (27.7 inHg). This made it a Category 4 on the Saffir-Simpson scale. The hurricane's intensity fluctuated before wind shear and cooler waters induced weakening. At 20:15 UTC on October 21, Norma hit the southern Baja California Peninsula near Cabo San Lucas with winds of 80 mph (130 km/h). It quickly weakened over land before crossing the Gulf of California. Around 10:30 UTC on October 22, Norma moved ashore near El Dorado, Sinaloa as a tropical depression, and it soon dissipated.

Norma brought large waves, flooding and high winds to Baja California Sur. Over 4 in (100 mm) of rain during its passage in some areas. Multiple wind gusts of more than 90 mph (140 km/h) (with a peak gust of 107 mph (172 km/h)) were recorded a weather station high in the hills surrounding Cabo San Lucas. Numerous streets and canals across La Paz flooded as the storm passed through. Also, the gusty winds blew down numerous trees damaged numerous sailboats along the city's coast. Resorts and hotels in Los Cabos Municipality suffered little damage from the storm. Due to the storm's impact on roads and other public infrastructure elsewhere, the governor of Baja California Sur issued a disaster declaration. Norma dumped heavy rains and caused widespread power outages in Sinaloa as it came ashore as a tropical depression. Three people died in the state, including two in vehicle-related accidents and a 3-year-old child due to electrocution. Broken glass, fallen trees and damage to homes and business was reported, mainly in the municipalities of Los Mochis, Ahome and Guasave.

=== Hurricane Otis ===
- Category 5 hurricane (SSHWS)
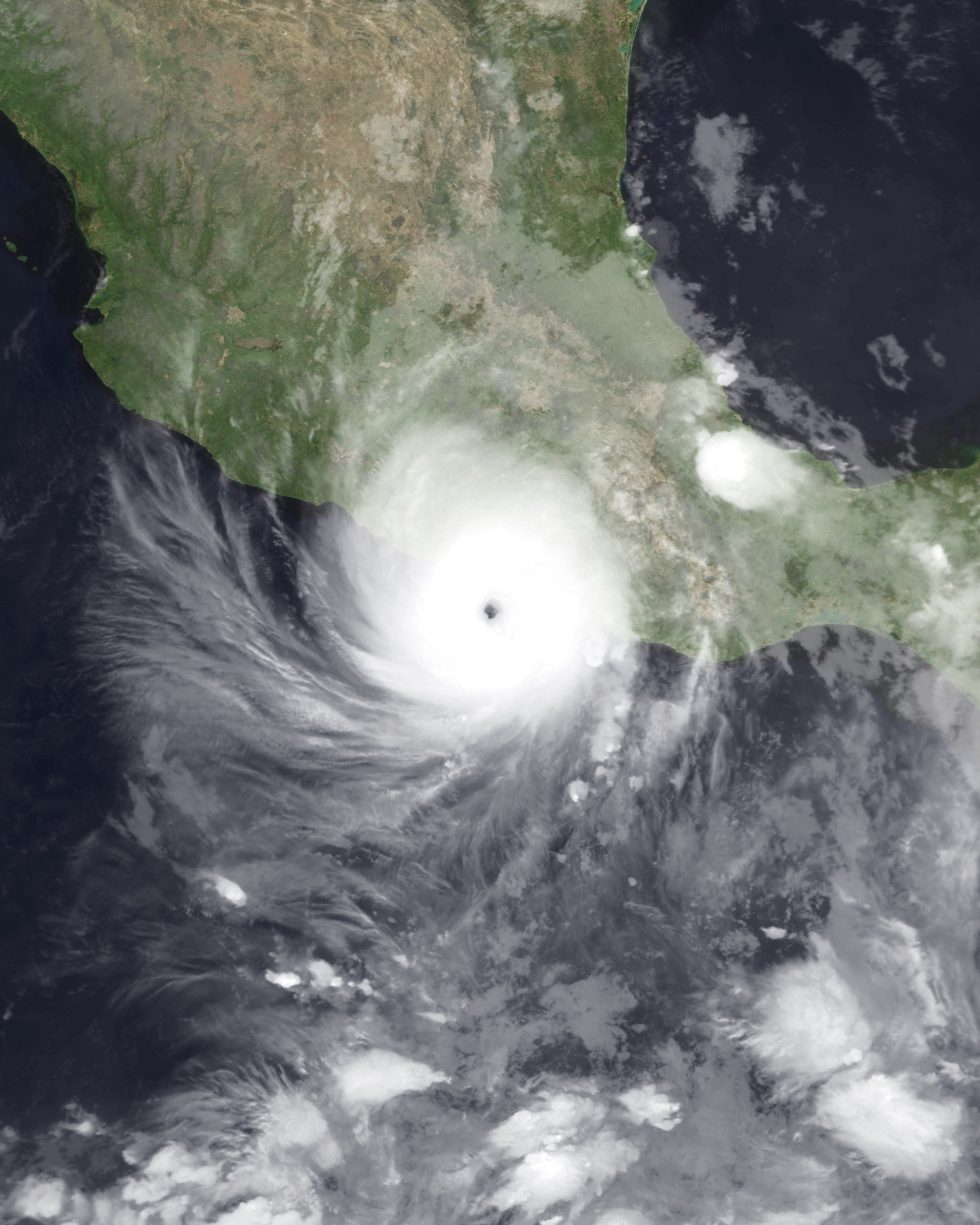
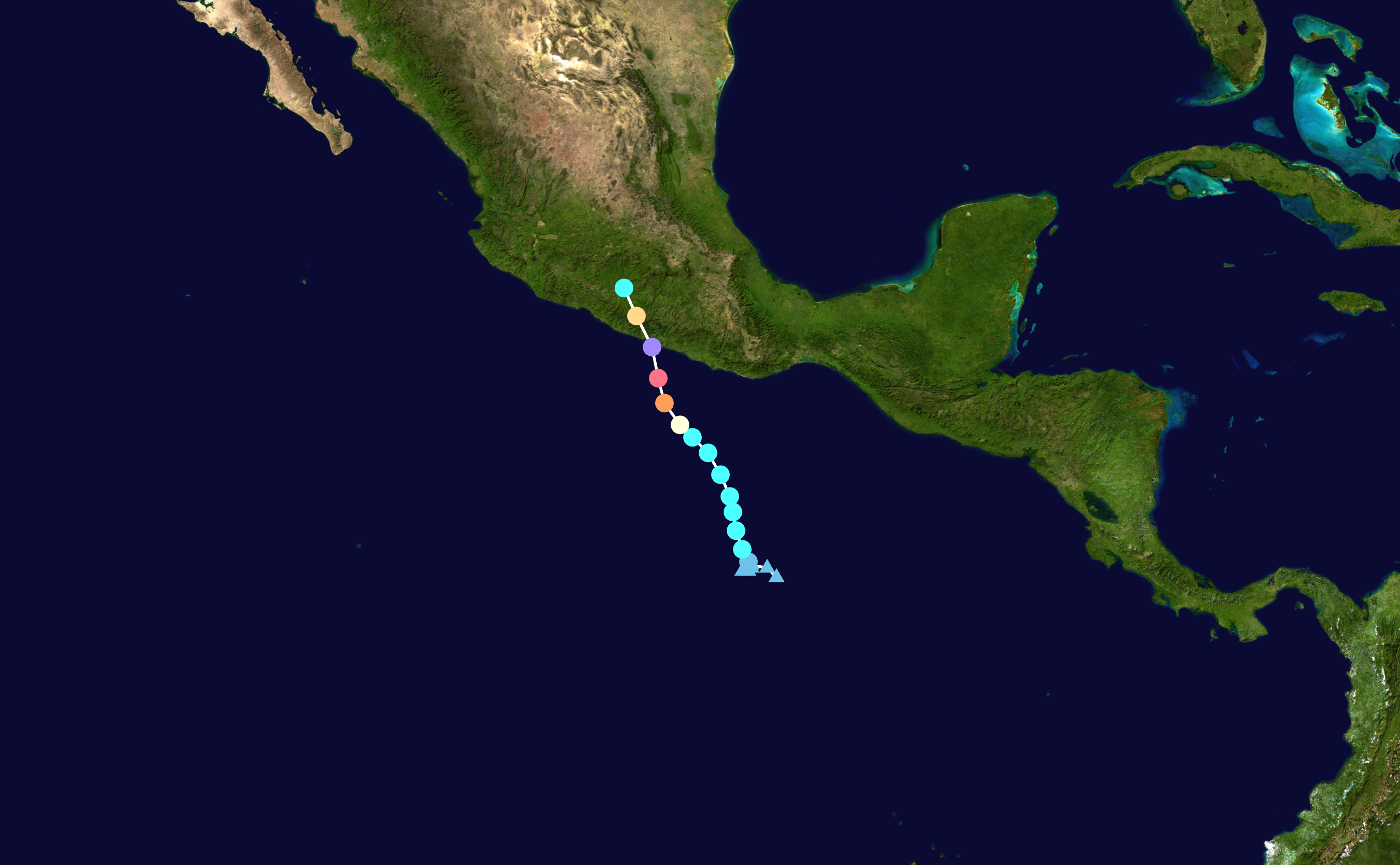
- Duration: October 22 – October 25
- Peak intensity: 165 mph (270 km/h) (1-min); 922 mbar (hPa)

On October 18, a broad area of low pressure formed south of the Gulf of Tehuantepec. It drifted there for a few days before becoming a tropical depression on the morning of October 22 about 530 mi (860 km) south-southeast of Acapulco, Guerrero. Then, that afternoon, it strengthened into Tropical Storm Otis, but moderate easterly wind shear and dry air inhibited further organization on October 23. However, on October 24, conditions became more favorable and an inner core formed, leading to a period of explosive intensification, during which Otis unexpectedly grew into a powerful 165 mph (270 km/h) Category 5 hurricane, with its winds increasing by 105 mph (165 km/h) over a period of 21 hours. Otis slightly weakened before making landfall near Acapulco at 06:45 UTC on October 25, as a Category 5 hurricane with winds of 160 mph (260 km/h) and a central pressure of 929 mb (27.43 inHg). Otis quickly weakened inland, becoming a tropical storm by 18:00 UTC and dissipating soon thereafter.

The hurricane caused at least 52 deaths (Note: Unconfirmed reports of additional bodies recovered would put the toll at 350. See the Casualties section for details.) and left 32 others missing. Total damage from Otis was estimated to be $12–16 billion (USD), making it the costliest Mexican hurricane on record, surpassing Hurricane Wilma in the Atlantic basin. Otis became the first ever hurricane to make landfall at Category 5 intensity in the eastern Pacific basin and on the Pacific Coast of Mexico, as well as one of the strongest hurricanes to strike Mexico.

=== Tropical Storm Pilar ===
- Tropical storm (SSHWS)
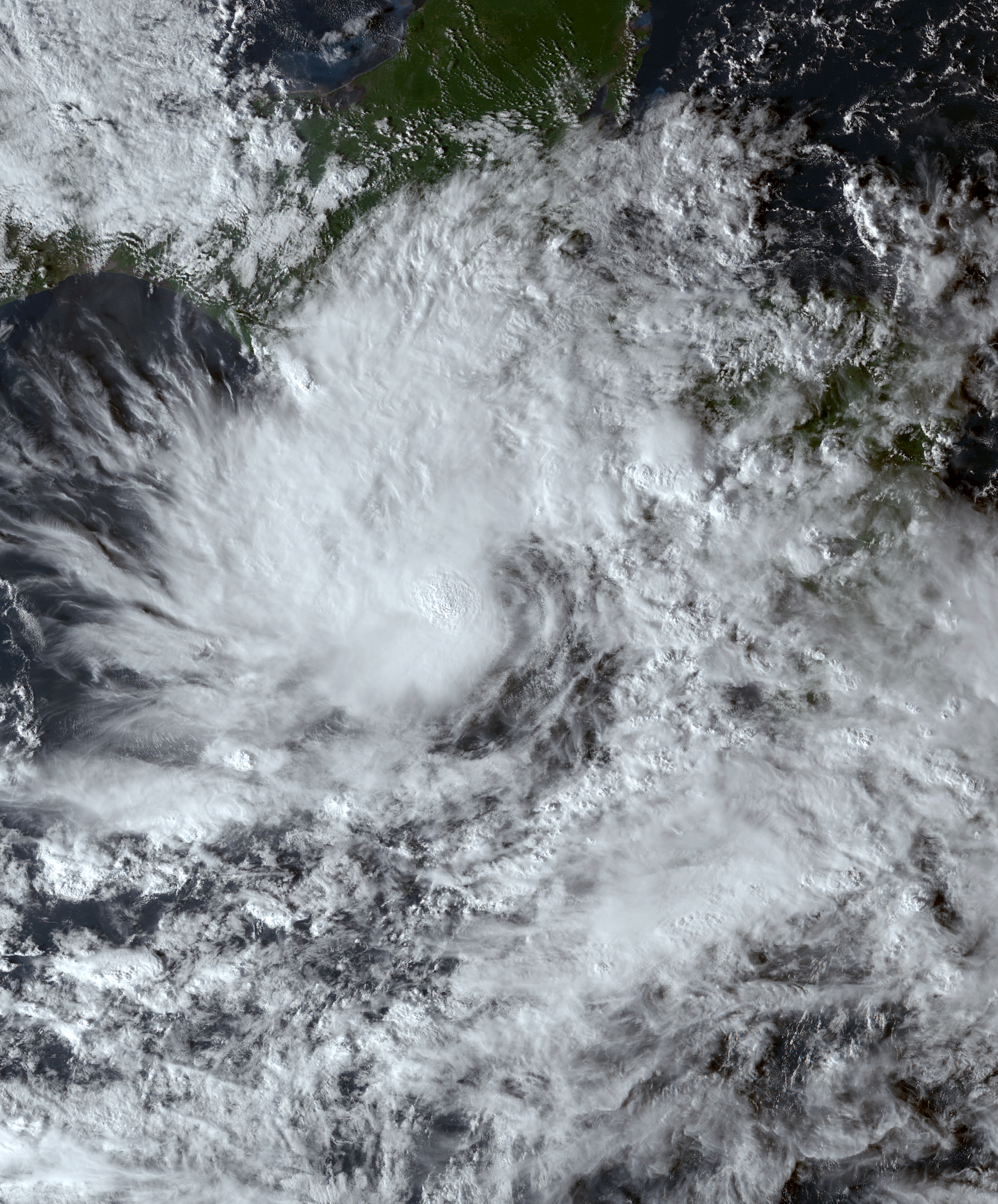
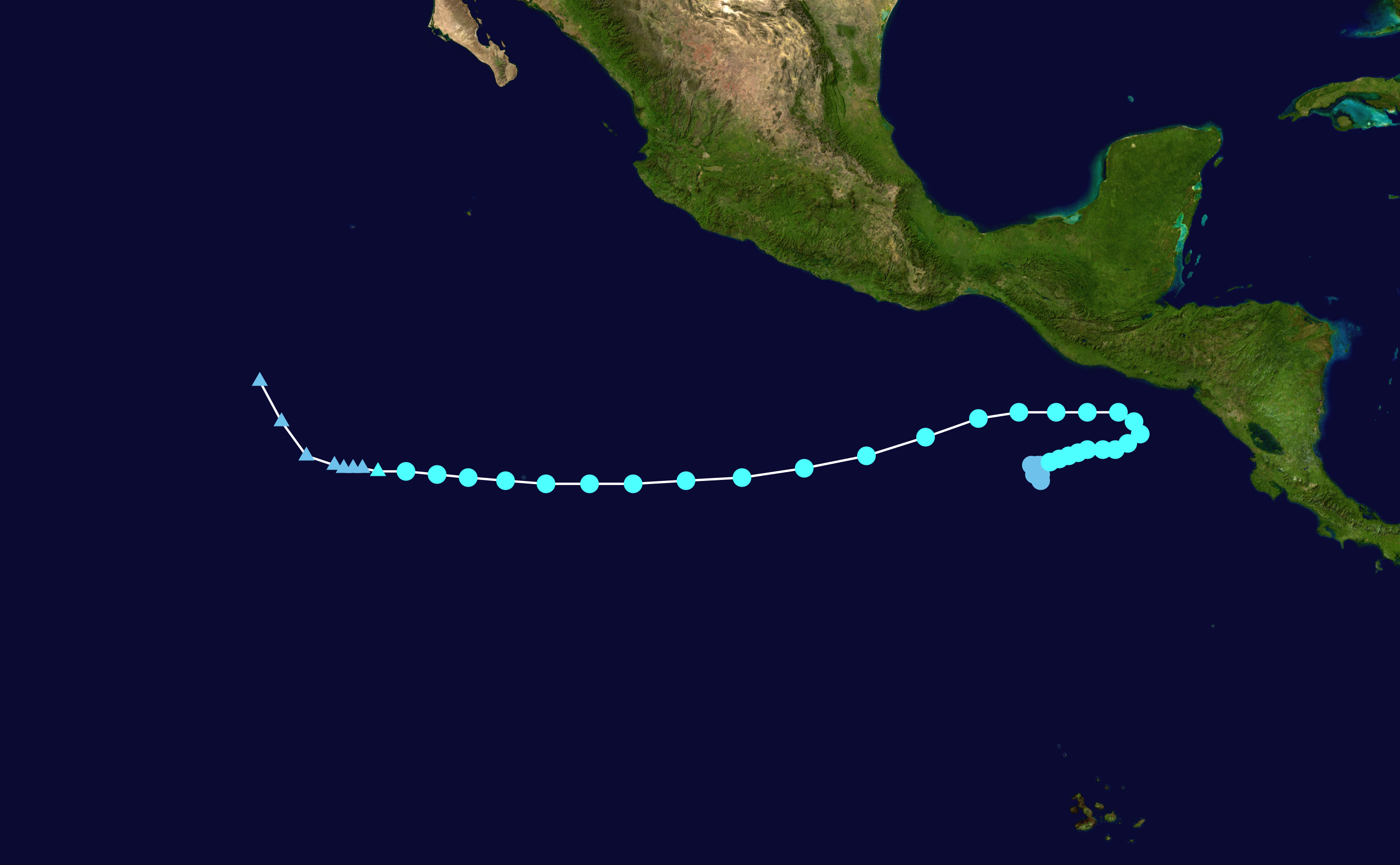
- Duration: October 28 – November 5
- Peak intensity: 65 mph (100 km/h) (1-min); 995 mbar (hPa)

On October 25, a broad area of low pressure, partially related to the remnants of Tropical Depression Twenty-One from the Atlantic basin, formed offshore Central America. Initially, the low was broad and poorly-defined, affected by easterly shear. On October 28, the system organized into Tropical Depression Nineteen‑E after developing convection and a well-defined circulation. The depression moved slowly east-northeastward as thunderstorms increased. Around 00:00 UTC on October 30, the depression strengthened into Tropical Storm Pilar while located about 255 mi (405 km) west-southwest of El Salvador. Pilar reached a peak intensity of 65 mph (100 km/h) early on November 1, about 90 mi (150 km) off the coast of El Salvador. Around this time, a strong cold front approaching from the northwestern Caribbean Sea and its associated mid-level ridge began redirecting the storm, which turned sharply northward and then westward, out to sea. The system moved quickly west-southwestward the following day, weakening along the way due to an influx of drier air brought about by the Gulf of Tehuantepec gap-wind flow it was embedded within. The storm slowed down on November 5, and turned northwestward in response to a mid-level trough extending southwest of the Baja California peninsula. Later that day, Pilar became bereft of organized convection, and degenerated into a post-tropical remnant low at 18:00 UTC. It later opened up into a trough late on November 7.

The storm led to a tropical storm watch from Puerto Sandino, Nicaragua, through the coast of El Salvador. The government of El Salvador declared a national emergency. School classes were cancelled across El Salvador, and around 100 shelters were prepared. The government of Costa Rica issued an Orange Alert. Heavy rainfall from Pilar inundated parts of El Salvador, Honduras, and Guatemala, flooding several rivers, which caused damage to homes, infrastructure, and crops. Recorded rainfall totals were highest in southeastern El Salvador, where a total of 8.89 in (225.9 mm) was reported near Beneficio La Carrera. Pilar caused four flood-related deaths, three in El Salvador due to drowning, and the other in Honduras. Several hundred people in the two countries, as well as in neighboring Guatemala moved to shelters during the storm. Pilar also brought heavy rainfall to western Nicaragua, displacing several families. The Professional services firm AON estimated a total storm loss of $45 million.

=== Tropical Storm Ramon ===
- Tropical storm (SSHWS)
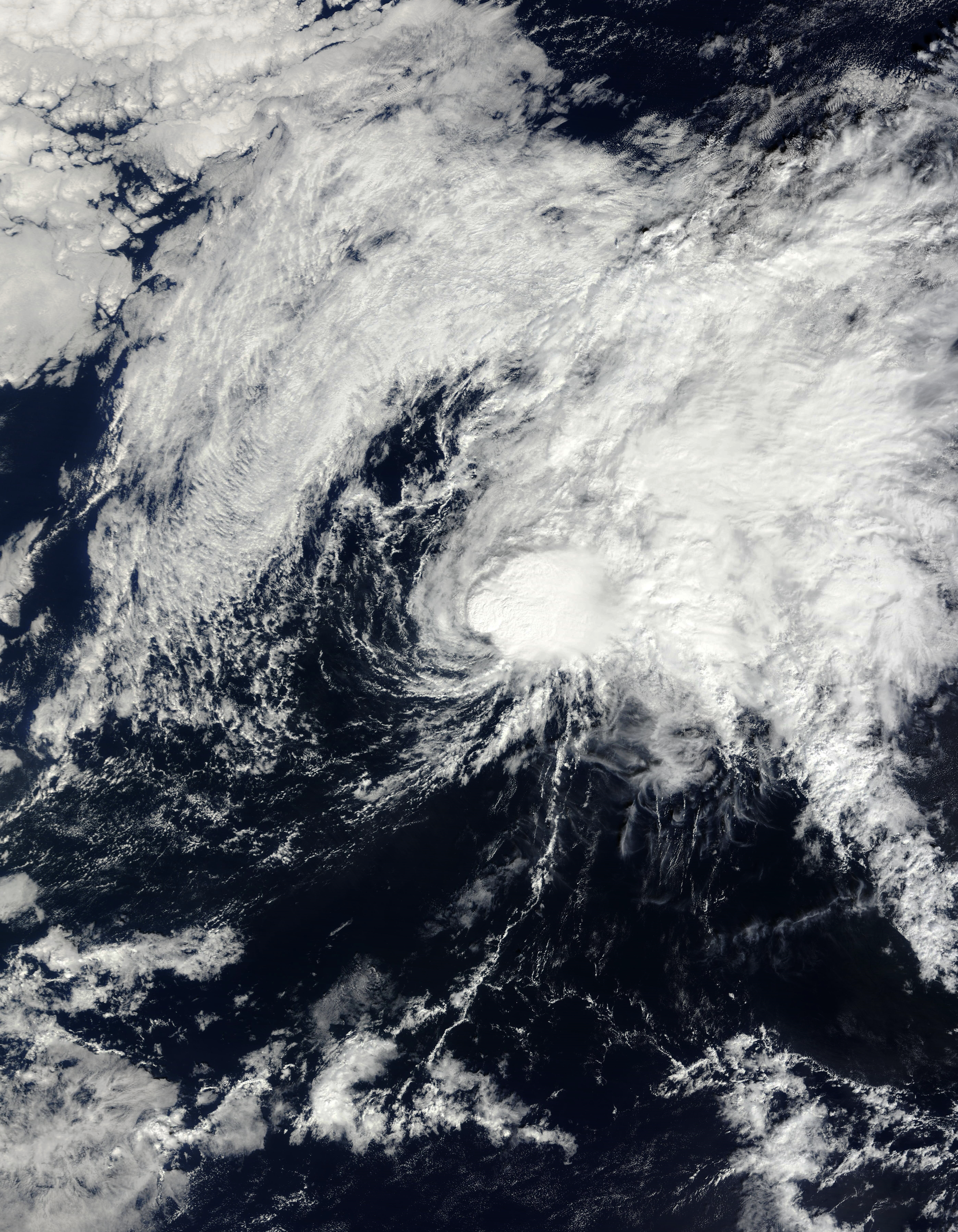
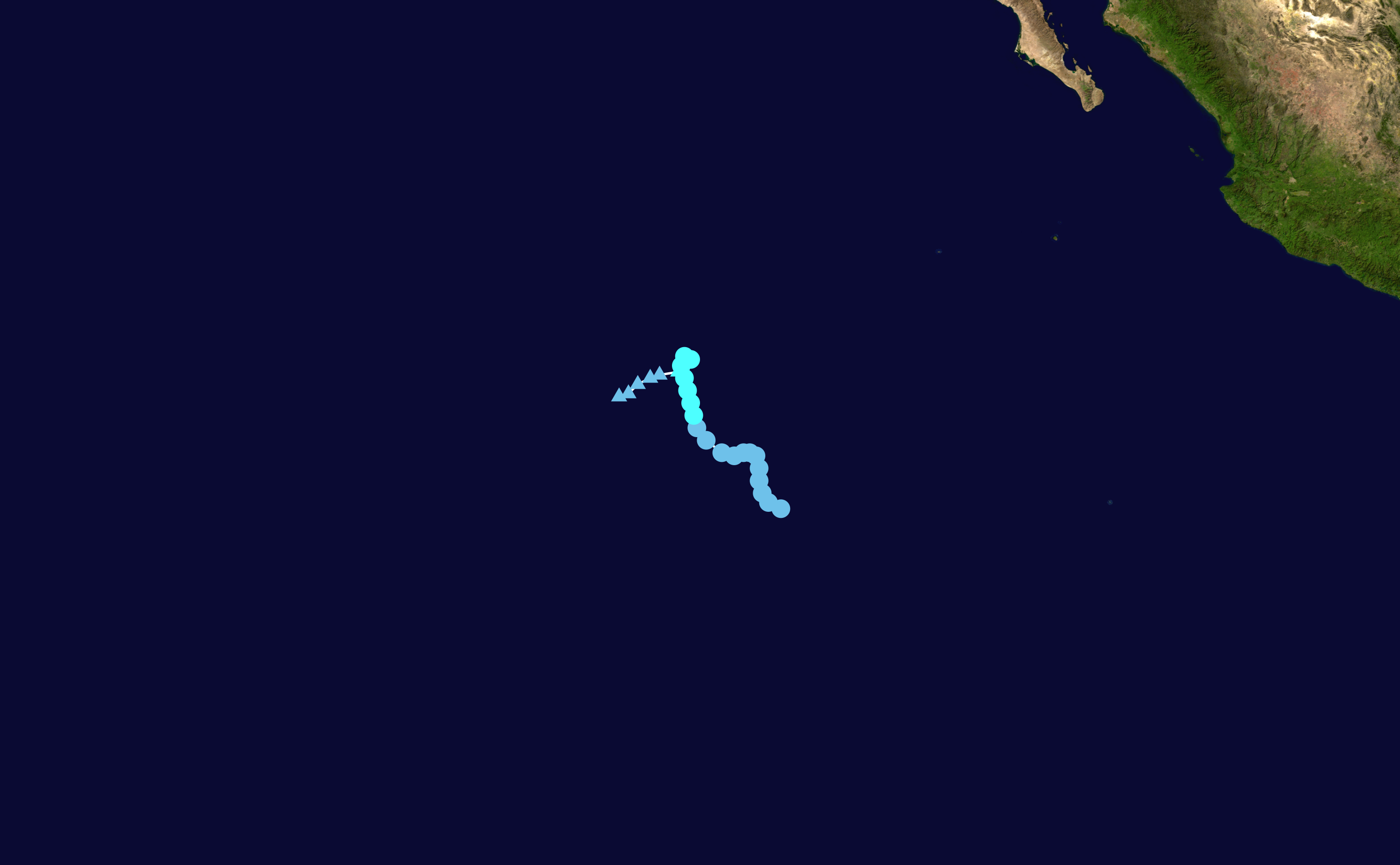
- Duration: November 23 – November 26
- Peak intensity: 45 mph (75 km/h) (1-min); 1002 mbar (hPa)

On November 16, a small area of low pressure producing some disorganized showers and thunderstorms formed about 1,000 mi (1,610 km) south-southwest of the southern tip of the Baja California Peninsula. Drifting west-northwestward, the showers and thunderstorms associated with the disturbance persisted and consolidated near the low-level center early on November 23, becoming Tropical Depression Twenty‑E. The following day there were isolated bursts of convection near the suspected low-level center of the depression, and, by day's end, it had become noticeably better organized, becoming Tropical Storm Ramon. Ramon became slightly stronger on the afternoon of November 25, though the distribution of convection around its center was asymmetrical due to very strong westerly wind shear. The distribution of wind speeds was also asymmetrical, with winds of tropical storm force limited to the eastern side of Ramon's circulation only. That night, wind shear in excess of 60 mph (95 km/h) in combination with an increasingly dry mid-level environment caused the storm to quickly weaken. By the morning of November 26, it was devoid of significant thunderstorm activity, and had degenerated into a remnant low.

== Storm names ==
The following list of names was used for named storms that formed in the North Pacific Ocean east of 140°W during 2023. This was the same list used for the 2017 season.

- Adrian
- Beatriz
- Calvin *
- Dora *
- Eugene
- Fernanda
- Greg *
- Hilary
- Irwin
- Jova
- Kenneth
- Lidia
- Max
- Norma
- Otis
- Pilar
- Ramon
- Selma (unused)
- Todd (unused)
- Veronica (unused)
- Wiley (unused)
- Xina (unused)
- York (unused)
- Zelda (unused)

For storms that form in the North Pacific from 140°W to the International Date Line, the names come from a series of four rotating lists. Names are used one after the other without regard to year, and when the bottom of one list is reached, the next named storm receives the name at the top of the next list. No storms formed within the area in 2023. Named storms in the table above that crossed into the area during the season are noted (*).

=== Retirement ===
On March 20, 2024, during the 46th session of the RA IV hurricane committee, the World Meteorological Organization retired the names Dora and Otis from its rotating name lists, and they will not be used in the Eastern Pacific basin again. They were replaced with Debora and Otilio, respectively, for the 2029 season. This was the first season since 2015 to have a retired name, and the first since 1997 to feature more than one retirement. In addition, it was the first season on record to have more than one retirement from the list used in the North Pacific Ocean east of 140°W.

== Season effects ==
This is a table of all of the storms that formed in the 2023 Pacific hurricane season. It includes their name, duration, peak classification and intensities, areas affected, damage, and death totals. Deaths in parentheses are additional and indirect (an example of an indirect death would be a traffic accident), but were still related to that storm. Damage and deaths include totals while the storm was extratropical, a wave, or a low, and all of the damage figures are in 2023 USD.

Saffir–Simpson scale
TD	TS	C1	C2	C3	C4	C5

2023 Pacific hurricane season season statistics
Storm name	Dates active	Storm category at peak intensity	Max 1-min wind mph (km/h)	Min. press. (mbar)	Areas affected	Damage (US$)	Deaths	Ref(s).
Adrian	June 27 – July 2	Category 2 hurricane	105 (165)	970	None	None	None	
Beatriz	June 29 – July 1	Category 1 hurricane	85 (140)	992	Western Mexico	Minimal	0 (1)	
Calvin	July 11–19	Category 3 hurricane	125 (205)	953	Hawaii	Minimal	None	
Four-E	July 20–21	Tropical depression	35 (55)	1006	None	None	None	
Dora	July 31 – August 12	Category 4 hurricane	150 (240)	939	Hawaii, Johnston Atoll (before crossover)	None	None	
Eugene	August 5–7	Tropical storm	70 (110)	992	California	$3,000	None	
Fernanda	August 12–17	Category 4 hurricane	130 (215)	949	None	None	None	
Greg	August 14–18	Tropical storm	65 (100)	994	None	None	None	
Hilary	August 16–20	Category 4 hurricane	140 (220)	940	Western Mexico, Revillagigedo Islands, Baja California peninsula, Western United States	$948 million	0 (2)	
Irwin	August 26–29	Tropical storm	45 (75)	998	None	None	None	
Jova	September 4–10	Category 5 hurricane	160 (260)	926	Western Mexico, Southwestern United States	$251,000	None	
Twelve-E	September 15–18	Tropical depression	35 (55)	1006	None	None	None	
Kenneth	September 19–22	Tropical storm	50 (85)	1000	None	None	None	
Fourteen-E	September 23–24	Tropical depression	35 (55)	1006	None	None	None	
Lidia	October 3–11	Category 4 hurricane	140 (220)	942	Western Mexico, Islas Marías, Southwestern Mexico	$79.2 million	3	
Max	October 8–10	Tropical storm	70 (110)	990	Southwestern Mexico	$38.6 million	2	
Norma	October 17–23	Category 4 hurricane	130 (215)	939	Baja California Sur, Sinaloa	$28.4 million	0 (3)	
Otis	October 22–25	Category 5 hurricane	165 (270)	922	Guerrero	$12–16 billion	≥52	
Pilar	October 28 – November 5	Tropical storm	65 (100)	995	Central America	$45 million	0 (4)	
Ramon	November 23–26	Tropical storm	45 (75)	1002	None	None	None	
Season aggregates
20 systems	June 27 – November 26		165 (270)	922		≥$13.1–17.1 billion	≥57 (10)	

== See also ==
- Weather of 2023
- Tropical cyclones in 2023
- 2023 Atlantic hurricane season
- 2023 Pacific typhoon season
- 2023 North Indian Ocean cyclone season
- South-West Indian Ocean cyclone seasons: 2022–23, 2023–24
- Australian region cyclone seasons: 2022–23, 2023–24
- South Pacific cyclone seasons: 2022–23, 2023–24
