= Hurricane Jova (2011) =

Category 3 Pacific hurricane in 2011

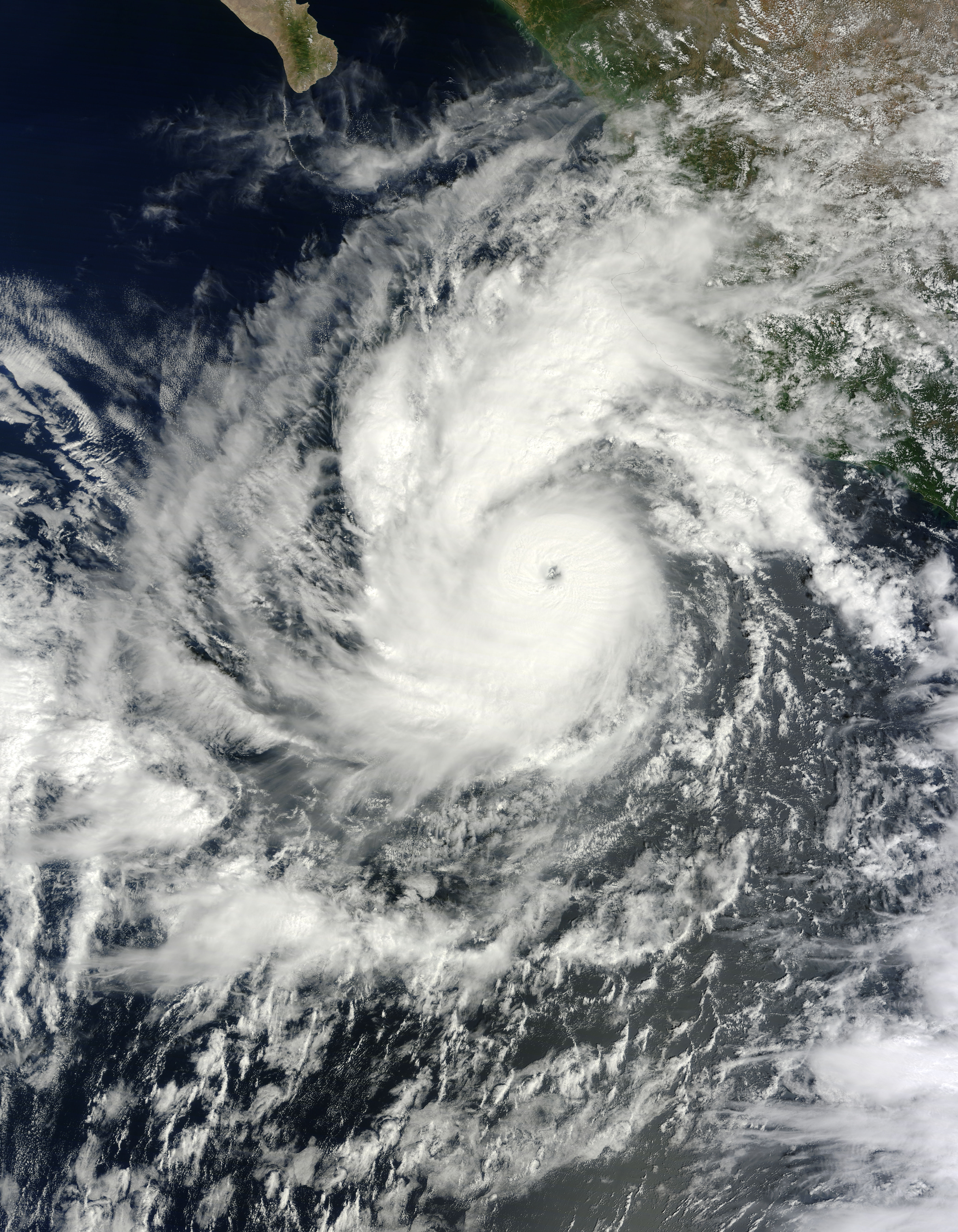
- Hurricane Jova near peak intensity on October 10, 2011

Meteorological history
- Formed: October 6, 2011
- Dissipated: October 12, 2011

Category 3 major hurricane
- 1-minute sustained (SSHWS/NWS)
- Highest winds: 125 mph (205 km/h)
- Lowest pressure: 955 mbar (hPa); 28.20 inHg

Overall effects
- Fatalities: 9 total
- Damage: $204 million
- Areas affected: Southwestern Mexico, Western Mexico
- IBTrACS /
- Part of the 2011 Pacific hurricane season

Hurricane Jova was a powerful Category 3 Pacific hurricane that made landfall on southwestern Mexico in October 2011. The tenth named storm, ninth hurricane and fifth major hurricane of the 2011 Pacific hurricane season, Jova developed from a tropical disturbance that initially formed on October 5, 2011. The disturbance steadily organized and acquired more thunderstorm activity over the following hours, and it became a tropical depression early on October 6. The depression strengthened into Tropical Storm Jova later that day. Moving generally northward, wind shear initially inhibited Jova from strengthening much until the establishment of more favorable conditions on October 8 allowed Jova to begin to intensify. It reached hurricane strength that day as it drifted eastwards, and major hurricane status on October 10 after a period of steady intensification. Jova reached peak intensity the following day as a high-end Category 3 hurricane, with maximum sustained winds of 125 mph (205 km/h), and a minimum barometric pressure of 955 mbar (28.20 inHg). Jova weakened somewhat as it approached the Pacific coast of Mexico, and made landfall near Barra de Navidad, Jalisco on October 12 as a still-powerful Category 2 hurricane. The storm rapidly weakened as it moved inland and dissipated later that day.

Tropical cyclone watches and warnings were issued for much of the west coast of Mexico ahead of the storm, extending from Nayarit to Michoacán. The ports of Puerto Vallarta and Manzanillo were closed, stranding some cargo ships. Evacuation shelters were opened across Jalisco. Jova brought destructive winds, flooding rain, and deadly mudslides mainly to the Mexican states of Jalisco and Colima, killing nine people and leaving six more injured. Roads and infrastructure were damaged, and 107,000 electricity customers lost power. Losses caused by Jova amounted to about MX$2.75 billion (US$204 million).

== Meteorological history ==
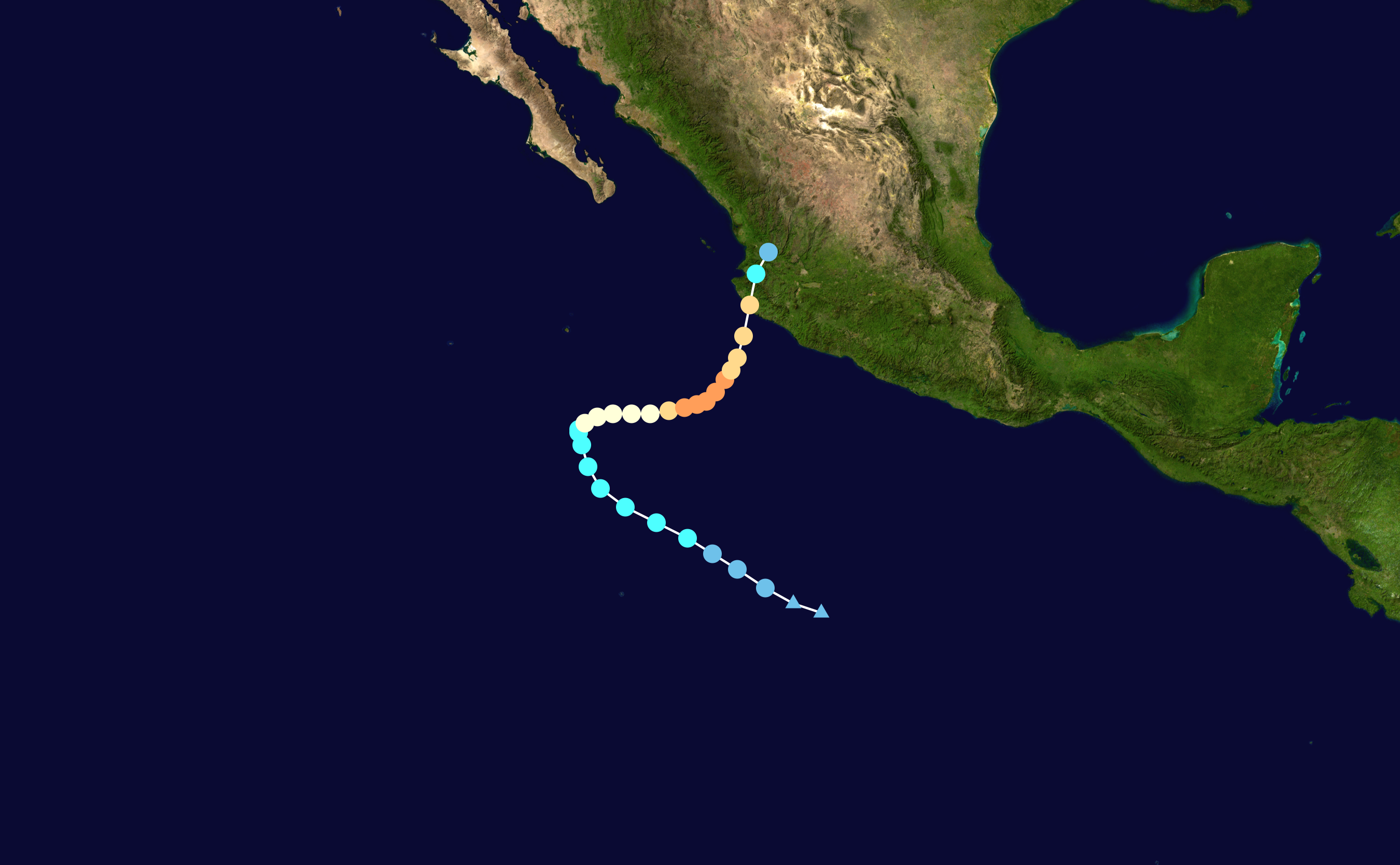
Map plotting the storm's track and intensity, according to the Saffir–Simpson scale Map key Saffir–Simpson scale Tropical depression (≤38 mph, ≤62 km/h) Tropical storm (39–73 mph, 63–118 km/h) Category 1 (74–95 mph, 119–153 km/h) Category 2 (96–110 mph, 154–177 km/h) Category 3 (111–129 mph, 178–208 km/h) Category 4 (130–156 mph, 209–251 km/h) Category 5 (≥157 mph, ≥252 km/h) Unknown Storm type Tropical cyclone Subtropical cyclone Extratropical cyclone, remnant low, tropical disturbance, or monsoon depression

On the morning of October 5, a disturbance formed within the Intertropical Convergence Zone about 495 mi (795 km) south of Acapulco, Mexico. A well-defined area of low pressure developed within the disturbance later that day as it moved westward. Thunderstorm activity associated with the disturbance became more organized over the course of the day, and it further developed into a tropical depression around 00:00 UTC on October 6. The depression continued to organize as it turned west-northwestwards around the southwestern edge of a subtropical ridge, becoming a tropical storm at 18:00 UTC about 505 mi (815 km) south-southwest of Manzanillo, Mexico, and was given the name Jova. In spite of moderate northeasterly wind shear displacing thunderstorm activity away from the low-level circulation center, Jova intensified slowly through October 7, with rainbands forming northwest of the center. At the same time, the ridge steering Jova began to weaken, causing the cyclone to decelerate and turn further north.

On October 8, the wind shear that had been negatively affecting Jova began to subside. Combined with favorable sea surface temperatures (SSTs) of 82–84 °F (28–29 °C), Jova began to strengthen more significantly as it moved north of the steering ridge and turned eastwards. Microwave satellite imagery revealed a nascent eye and eyewall late on October 8, marking Jova's intensification into a hurricane. The inner core continued to improve in organization into October 9, with the eye contracting to a diameter of 17 mi (28 km). A reconnaissance aircraft investigating the storm also estimated that the central pressure fell at a rate of 3 mbar (0.089 inHg) an hour, indicative of a quickly strengthening system. Jova became a major hurricane by 06:00 UTC on October 10 and reached its peak intensity twelve hours later with maximum sustained winds of 125 mph (205 km/h)—at the upper end of Category 3 intensity on the Saffir–Simpson scale. The minimum central pressure was 955 mbar (28.20 inHg), as derived from dropsonde data.

After reaching its peak intensity, Jova began to gradually weaken on October 11 as an upper-atmospheric trough over the Baja California Peninsula generated southwesterly wind shear over the hurricane. The trough also began pulling Jova north-northeastwards. The eye became cloud-filled and the eyewall began to fragment as the wind shear disrupted the storm's organization, causing Jova to weaken below major hurricane status at 12:00 UTC on October 11. At the time, the system was centered just 140 mi (220 km) south-southwest of Manzanillo, Mexico. Jova subsequently accelerated towards the Mexican coast, making landfall 40 mi (65 km) northwest of Barra de Navidad, Jalisco, at 12:00 UTC on October 12. The hurricane briefly halted its weakening trend right before landfall, with the eye becoming visible on satellite imagery once again. This allowed Jova to remain a Category 2 hurricane at landfall, possessing winds of 100 mph (155 km/h). The mountains of western Mexico greatly disrupted Jova's circulation as it moved inland, causing the hurricane to rapidly degrade to a tropical storm within six hours of landfall. The system's surface circulation dissipated entirely by 00:00 UTC on October 13 over the mountainous terrain of Mexico.

== Preparations ==
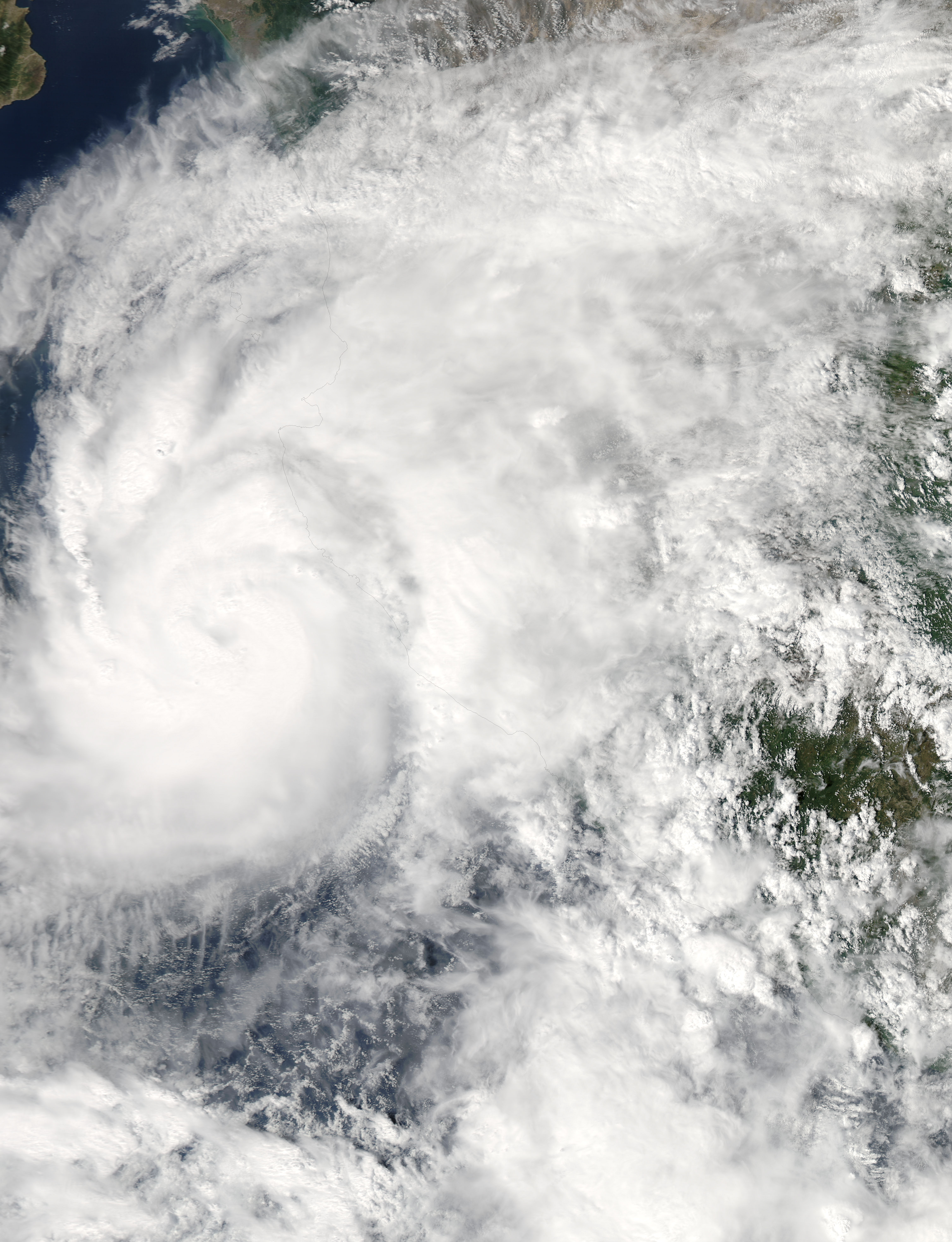
Hurricane Jova approaching Western Mexico on October 11.

Early in Jova's duration, the United States National Hurricane Center (NHC) predicted that the storm would strike southwestern Mexico as a hurricane, within its five-day forecast. Beginning on October 8, the NHC advised residents in Mexico to monitor Jova's path; the next day, the Mexican government issued a hurricane watch from Punta San Telmo in southwestern Michoacán to Cabo Corrientes, Jalisco, with a tropical storm watch extending further south to Lázaro Cárdenas, Michoacán. Six hours later, the watches were both upgraded to warnings. A day later, a tropical storm watch was issued north of the hurricane warning area to San Blas, Nayarit.

The port of Puerto Vallarta was closed, where residents boarded up shops and stayed at home. Fishermen stocked up on food and water, though some residents failed to prepare like they did for Hurricane Kenna, the last major hurricane to have severe effects on the region, nine years prior. Hotels were deserted and shops were closed. Even though no mandatory evacuations were ordered for the city, businesses were closed and boarded up in nearby towns. Officials in Jalisco opened up 70 shelters in 11 municipalities. The port of Manzanillo was closed, stranding 13 cargo ships. The Mexican Navy evacuated a total of 2,600 people from the region as Jova approached.

== Impact ==
In Mexico, nine people were killed by Hurricane Jova, and an additional six people were injured. A 71-year-old woman drowned in Colima after a strong current swept away the car in which she and her son were riding. In the neighboring state of Jalisco, a mudslide in the town of Cihuatlan killed a 21-year-old woman and her daughter, simultaneously destroying their home. The body of a man swept away by floodwaters was also found in a river. In the town of Tomatlán, a man and a teenage boy died after heavy rain caused their house to collapse in on them.

Flooding washed out a bridge and destroyed stretches of highways leading out of Manzanillo, while strong winds damaged transmission cables and billboards across the city. Power outages that resulted due to Jova affected 107,000 electricity customers. Several roads were damaged by the storm, and landslides and flooding blocked three main highways connecting cities in Jalisco and Colima. Throughout Jalisco, losses from Jova reached MX$1.3 billion (US$96 million) and roughly 46,280 people were affected by the storm. In Colima, preliminary losses to the tourism industry were estimated at 170 million pesos (US$13 million). Infrastructural damage from the storm in Colima reached 1.283 billion pesos (US$94.87 million).

== See also ==
- Other storms named Jova
- Hurricane Winifred (1992) - took a similar track and had a similar intensity
- Hurricane Bud (2012) - affected the same areas a few months later
- Hurricane Roslyn (2022) - also struck southwestern Mexico as a powerful hurricane in October
- Hurricane Lidia (2023) - also struck southwestern Mexico as a powerful hurricane in October in 2023
