= Hurricane Jova (2023) =

Category 5 Pacific hurricane

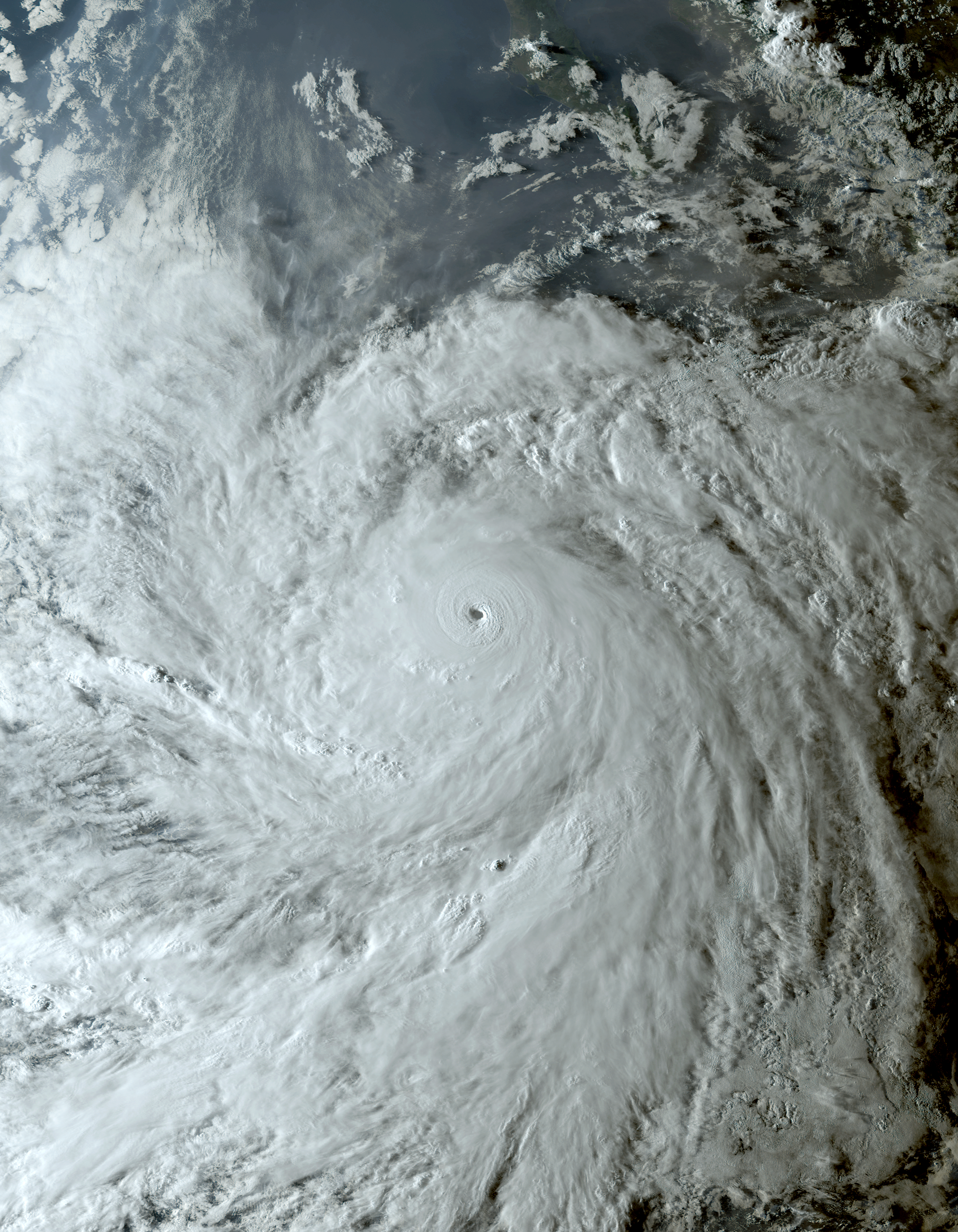
- Jova at peak intensity on September 7

Meteorological history
- Formed: September 4, 2023
- Remnant low: September 10, 2023
- Dissipated: September 14, 2023

Category 5 major hurricane
- 1-minute sustained (SSHWS/NWS)
- Highest winds: 160 mph (260 km/h)
- Lowest pressure: 926 mbar (hPa); 27.34 inHg

Overall effects
- Fatalities: None reported
- Damage: $251,000 (2023 USD)
- Areas affected: Western Mexico, Baja California peninsula, Southwestern United States
- Part of the 2023 Pacific hurricane season

Hurricane Jova was a very powerful tropical cyclone that became the first Pacific hurricane to reach Category 5 strength on the Saffir-Simpson scale since Willa in 2018. Jova was also one of the fastest–intensifying tropical cyclones on record in the Eastern Pacific tropical cyclone basin. The tenth named storm, seventh hurricane, and fifth major hurricane (Note: A major hurricane is a storm that ranks as Category 3 or higher on the Saffir–Simpson hurricane wind scale.) of the 2023 Pacific hurricane season, Jova originated from a tropical wave that entered the Pacific Ocean on September 1. The system rapidly organized and became a tropical depression the following day. After brief inhibition by wind shear, the system explosively organized over the next two days. It formed a prominent feature in its central dense overcast on September 5 and a nascent eye feature, signaling its intensification into a hurricane. In a 24-hour period ending early on September 7, Jova's maximum sustained winds significantly increased from 90 mph (150 km/h) to its peak at 160 mph (260 km/h) and its central pressure fell by 67 mbar (hPa; 1.89 inHg) to its minimum of 926 mbar (hPa; 27.43 inHg). This made it a Category 5 hurricane and was one of the five-fastest periods of intensification on record in the basin. Thereafter, an eyewall replacement cycle commenced. and decreasing sea surface temperatures caused the storm to gradually weaken, It fell below major hurricane status on September 8 and further weakened to a tropical storm on September 9. The total collapse of convection on September 10 marked its degeneration into a remnant low. The system later dissipated on September 12 as it opened up into a trough.

Jova's expansive cloud shield led to some rainfall in the western states of Mexico with minor flooding occurring in Baja California Sur. Large waves and rip currents affected coastal areas from Sinaloa northward to the San Francisco Bay Area in California. Flooding in Arizona inflicted $250,000 in damage.

== Meteorological history ==
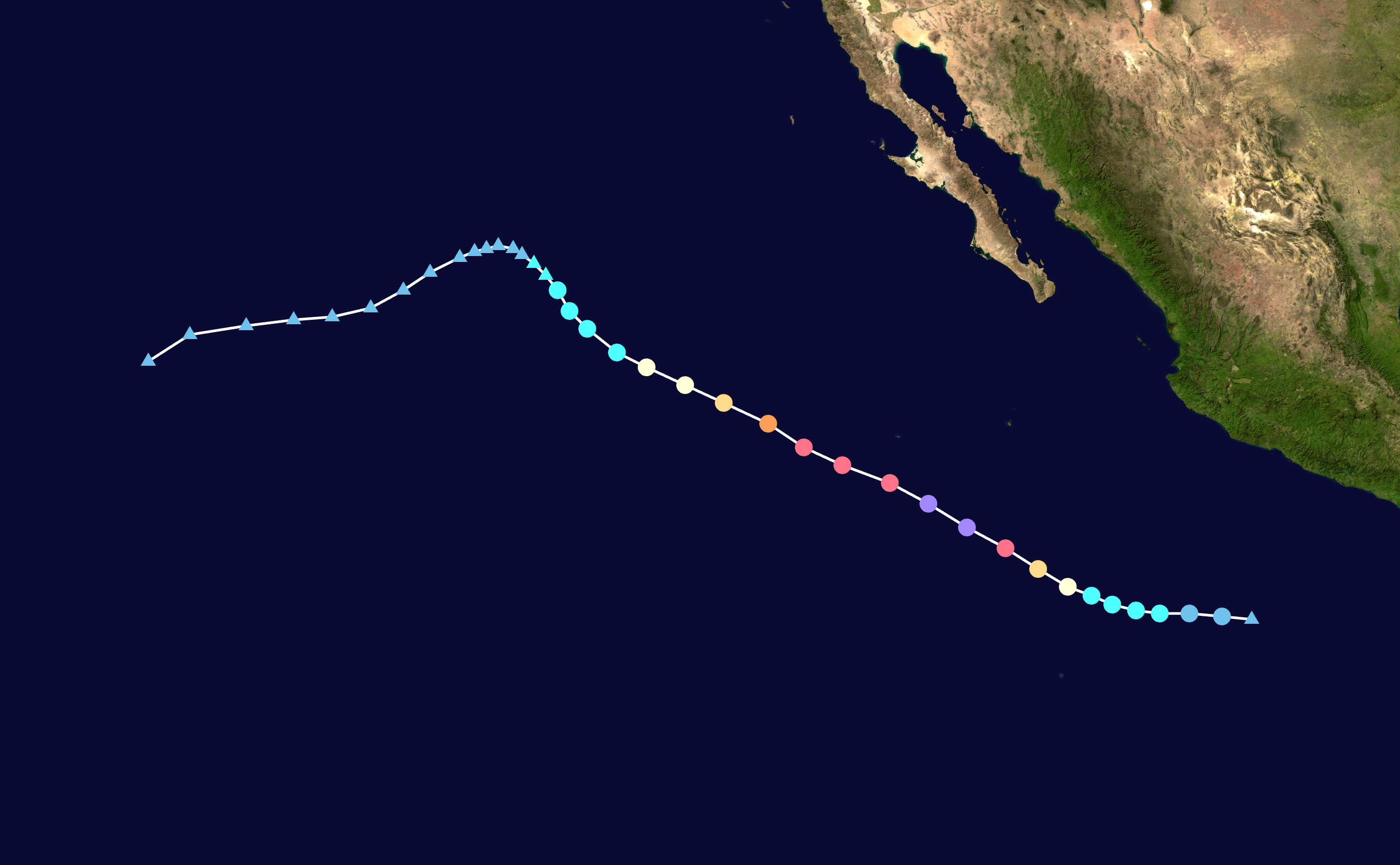
Map plotting the storm's track and intensity, according to the Saffir–Simpson scale Map key Saffir–Simpson scale Tropical depression (≤38 mph, ≤62 km/h) Tropical storm (39–73 mph, 63–118 km/h) Category 1 (74–95 mph, 119–153 km/h) Category 2 (96–110 mph, 154–177 km/h) Category 3 (111–129 mph, 178–208 km/h) Category 4 (130–156 mph, 209–251 km/h) Category 5 (≥157 mph, ≥252 km/h) Unknown Storm type Tropical cyclone Subtropical cyclone Extratropical cyclone, remnant low, tropical disturbance, or monsoon depression

On August 31, 2023, the National Hurricane Center (NHC) began forecasting the possibility of tropical cyclogenesis off the southwest coast of Mexico. The following day, a tropical wave crossed into the Pacific Ocean near El Salvador. Environmental conditions favored development and the NHC assessed a high likelihood of the system becoming a tropical cyclone within seven days. Convective activity began organizing on September 3 as a broad area of low pressure coalesced. On September 4, the system developed a well-defined surface circulation accompanied by a prominent banding feature to its west. Based on the improved organization, the NHC assessed the formation of Tropical Depression Eleven-E at 21:00 UTC. The environment ahead of the cyclone proved exceptionally conducive to rapid intensification with ample low-level moisture, low wind shear, and high sea surface temperatures. A deep-layer ridge anchored over northern Mexico steered the depression on a west to west-northwest course and would remain the dominant steering factor throughout the cyclone's duration. While initially hampered by moderate wind shear early on September 5, strengthening began later that day as upper-level outflow improved and deep convection blossomed over the system's center. Concurrent with the improved structure, the NHC estimated the system to have reached tropical storm intensity at 09:00 UTC, and the storm received the name Jova.

Hurricane Jova rapidly intensifying over the course of the day on September 6

Rapid intensification ensued later on September 5 as a central dense overcast developed with tops reaching −112 °F (−80 °C). Imagery from the GPM Microwave Imager depicted the beginnings of a mid-level eyewall. This trend continued into September 6 as cloud tops deepened to −130 °F (−90 °C) and Jova's eye became more defined on infrared and visible satellite imagery. Following this, the NHC upgraded Jova to a hurricane at 09:00 UTC. Dramatic intensification continued throughout September 6 into the early hours of September 7. A well-defined 12 mi (19 km) wide pinhole eye formed within a symmetrical convective mass. Extensive lightning was detected within the eyewall by the GOES-16 Geostationary Lightning Mapper. Jova's intensification culminated at 03:00 UTC when it reached Category 5 hurricane status. Jova's maximum sustained winds peaked at 160 mph (260 km/h) and its central pressure fell to 926 mbar (hPa; 27.43 inHg). Within a 24-hour period Jova's winds increased by 90 mph (150 km/h), ranking it among the top six fastest intensification episodes in the Eastern Pacific basin on record.

Upon reaching its peak on September 7, Jova began an eyewall replacement cycle (ERC) whereby its small eye was replaced by a larger one. Its convective structure became less symmetric as convective bursts occurred along the south side of its center and overall cloud tops warmed. By the latter half of the day weakening ensued with the hurricane's inner core collapsing as the ERC progressed and its eye becoming obscured by clouds. The hurricane's structure steadily degraded with the inner and outer cores fragmenting as dry air was pulled into the circulation. Jova weakened below major hurricane status by 09:00 UTC on September 8. Later that day, Jova crossed a sharp sea surface temperature gradient, with temperatures ahead of the hurricane dropping substantially. Banding features surrounding the hurricane began breaking apart at this time. Early on September 9, Jova's eye completely disappeared and deep convection became limited to the western half of the storm, soon after, the system was downgraded to a tropical storm. Jova's movement shifted northwest as it reached the edge of the ridge that had been steering it west-northwest. Throughout September 9 convection pulsated as Jova's weakening trend briefly reprieved, however, the storm's convection continued its collapse on September 10 as Jova traversed 23 °C (73 °F) waters. With the complete loss of convective activity later that day, Jova degenerated into a remnant low by 21:00 UTC marking the cessation of it being a tropical cyclone. The remnants of Jova turned west-southwest and dissipated as it opened up into a trough on September 12.

== Preparations and impact ==
Mexico's Servicio Meteorológico Nacional warned of heavy rains in Baja California Sur, Colima, Jalisco, Nayarit, and Sinaloa stemming from Jova's immense cloud shield. Waves of 6.6–13.1 ft (2–4 m) were expected along the coasts of Colima, Jalisco, Nayarit and Sinaloa. Four beaches in Los Cabos were closed due to dangerous conditions. Heavy rains in Baja California Sur swelled small streams, flooded roads, and caused some vehicles to become stranded.

Increased swells produced by Hurricane Jova on September 10 in Pacific Palisades, California

Moisture associated with Jova was pulled into the Southwestern United States by upper-level southwesterly flow, reaching California on September 10. This led to increased humidity in coastal areas. Minimal rainfall was recorded that day in the mountains of southern California. While Doppler weather radar returns showed rain in the region, dryer low- to mid-level air evaporated the rainfall before it reached the ground. Additional moisture reached far northwestern Arizona and southern portions of the Great Basin in Nevada. In the former, flash floods along Short Creek in Colorado City forced the closures of all crossings and damaged the Hildale Street crossing with losses totaling $250,000. In Nevada, some roads were covered with debris when the Meadow Valley Wash flooded. Waves of 5–8 ft (1.5–2.4 m) and rip currents were forecast for south-facing beaches in Los Angeles and Ventura Counties as well as the Channel Islands. This prompted a high surf advisory for the region. The San Francisco Bay Area farther north faced similar risks with rip currents and breaking waves up to 8 ft (2.4 m). Five people were rescued in Ocean Beach, San Francisco, after being pulled to sea by rip currents on September 10.

== See also ==
- Weather of 2023
- Tropical cyclones in 2023
- Other storms of the same name
- Timeline of the 2023 Pacific hurricane season
- List of Category 5 Pacific hurricanes
  - Hurricane Linda (1997) – a category 5 hurricane that followed a similar path to Jova
  - Hurricane Marie (2014) – a category 5 hurricane that also followed a similar path to Jova
