= List of storms named Jova =

The name Jova has been used for seven tropical cyclones in the Eastern Pacific Ocean.

- Hurricane Jova (1981) – Category 1 hurricane that passed north of Hawaii as a tropical depression
- Hurricane Jova (1987) – Category 2 hurricane that stayed at sea
- Hurricane Jova (1993) – Category 4 hurricane that paralleled the Mexican coast
- Hurricane Jova (2005) – Category 3 hurricane, passed near Hawaii but did not affect land
- Hurricane Jova (2011) – Category 3 hurricane, made landfall in Mexico as a Category 2 hurricane
- Tropical Storm Jova (2017) – weak storm that formed from the remnants of Atlantic Hurricane Franklin, did not affect land
- Hurricane Jova (2023) – Category 5 hurricane that stayed in the open ocean, one of the fastest-intensifying Pacific hurricanes on record
