= Timeline of the 2023 Pacific hurricane season =

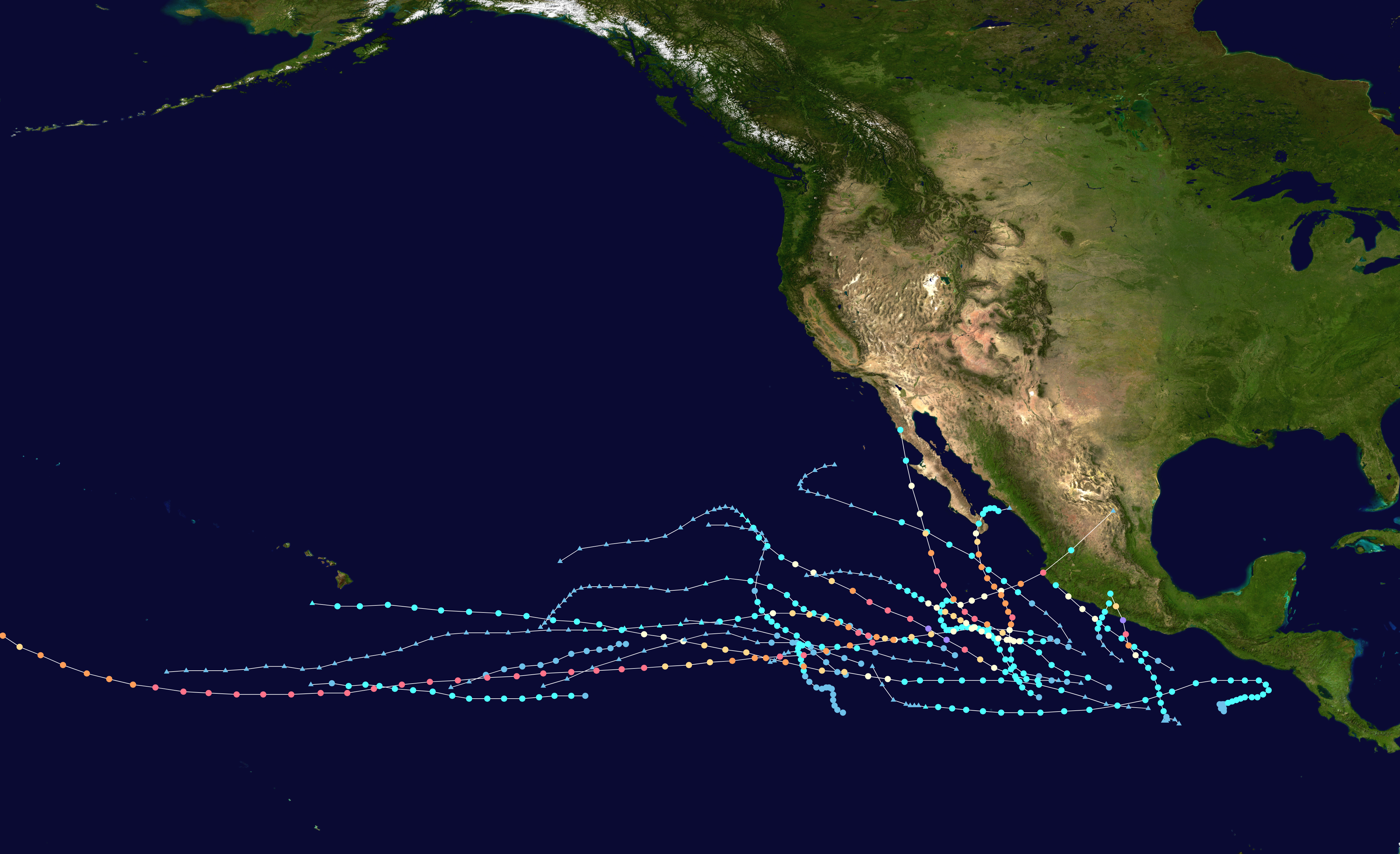
- Season summary map

Season boundaries
- First system formed: June 27, 2023
- Last system dissipated: November 26, 2023

Strongest system
- Name: Otis
- Maximum winds: 165 mph (270 km/h)
- Lowest pressure: 922 mbar (hPa; 27.23 inHg)

Longest lasting system
- Name: Dora
- Duration: 11.5 (Note: Denotes number of days Hurricane Dora existed in the Eastern and Central Pacific basins, before crossing over into the Western Pacific basin.) days
Storm articles
- Hurricane Dora (2023)
- Hurricane Hilary
- Hurricane Jova (2023)
- Hurricane Lidia (2023)
- Tropical Storm Max (2023)
- Hurricane Norma (2023)
- Hurricane Otis

The 2023 Pacific hurricane season was a fairly active Pacific hurricane season. In the eastern Pacific basin (east of 140°W), 17 named storms formed; 10 of those became hurricanes, and 8 further intensified into major hurricanes (category 3 or higher on the 5-level Saffir–Simpson wind speed scale). In the central Pacific basin (between 140°W and the International Date Line), no tropical cyclones formed (for the fourth consecutive season), though four entered into the basin from the east. The season officially began on May 15, 2023, in the eastern Pacific, and on June 1 in the central Pacific; it ended in both on November 30. These dates, adopted by convention, historically describe the period in each year when most tropical cyclogenesis occurs in these regions of the Pacific. The season's first system, Tropical Storm Adrian, developed on June 27, and its last, Tropical Storm Ramon, dissipated on November 26.

This timeline documents tropical cyclone formations, strengthening, weakening, landfalls, extratropical transitions, and dissipations during the season. It includes information that was not released throughout the season, meaning that data from post-storm reviews by the National Hurricane Center, such as a storm that was not initially warned upon, has been included.

The time stamp for each event is first stated using Coordinated Universal Time (UTC), the 24-hour clock where 00:00 = midnight UTC. The NHC uses both UTC and the time zone where the center of the tropical cyclone is currently located. The time zones utilized (east to west) are: Central, Mountain, Pacific and Hawaii. In this timeline, the respective area time is included in parentheses. Additionally, figures for maximum sustained winds and position estimates are rounded to the nearest 5 units (miles, or kilometers), following National Hurricane Center practice. Direct wind observations are rounded to the nearest whole number. Atmospheric pressures are listed to the nearest millibar and nearest hundredth of an inch of mercury.

== Timeline ==
=== May ===
- No tropical cyclones form in the Eastern Pacific basin during the month of May.

May 15

- The Eastern Pacific hurricane season officially begins.

=== June ===
June 1

- The Central Pacific hurricane season officially begins.

June 27

- 12:00 UTC (6:00 a.m. MDT) at 15.2°N 104.5°W – A tropical depression forms from a tropical wave about 290 mi (465 km) south of Manzanillo, Colima.
- 18:00 UTC (12:00 p.m. MDT) at 15.2°N 104.5°W – The tropical depression strengthens into Tropical Storm Adrian about 290 mi (465 km) south of Manzanillo.

June 28

- 12:00 UTC (6:00 a.m. MDT) at 15.2°N 107.6°W – Tropical Storm Adrian strengthens into a Category 1 hurricane about 385 mi (620 km) southwest of Manzanillo.

June 29

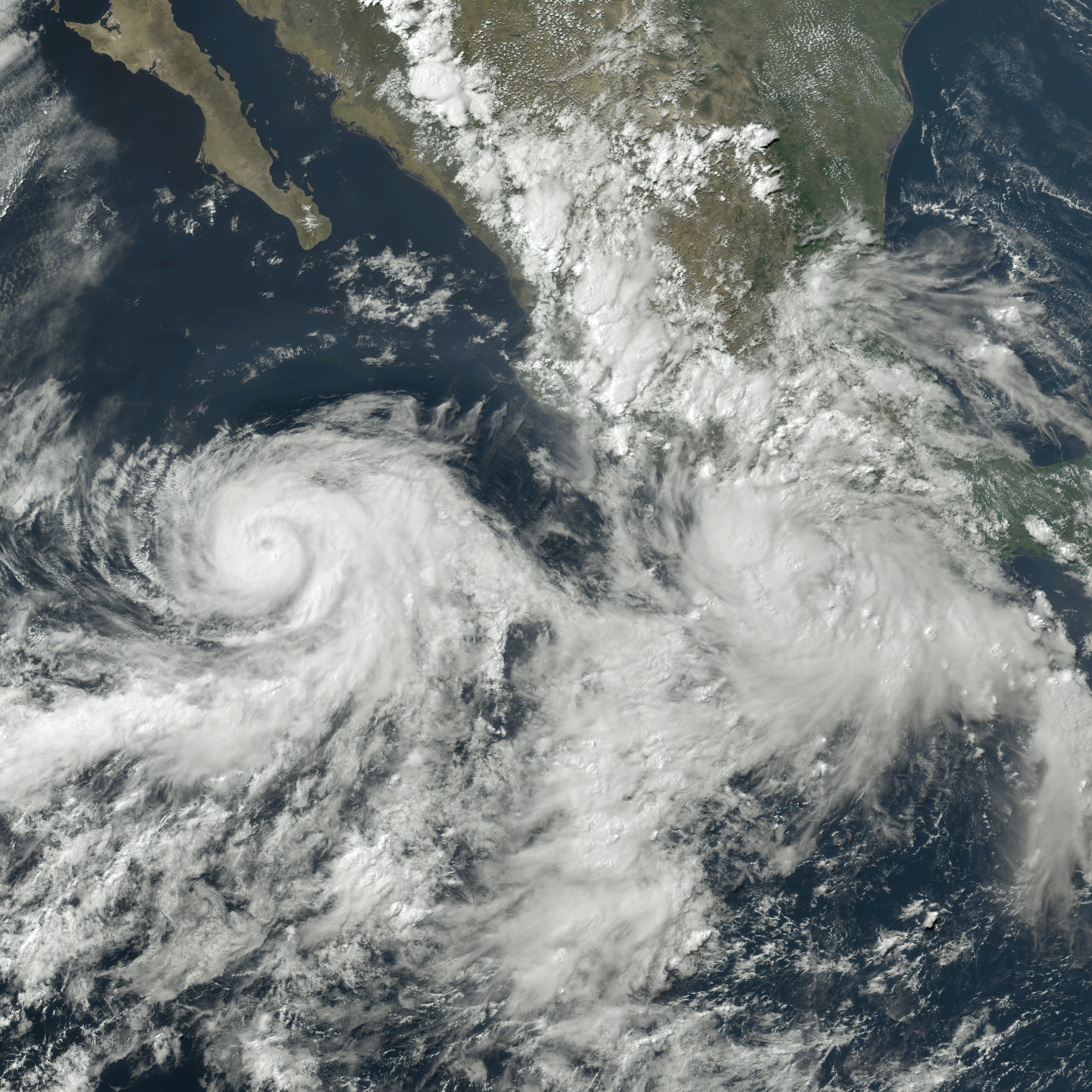
Satellite image of Hurricane Adrian (left) and Tropical Storm Beatriz (right) off the southwestern coast of Mexico on June 29

- 06:00 UTC (1:00 a.m. CDT) at 13.8°N 97.3°W – Tropical Depression Two‑E forms from a tropical wave (Note: Beatriz formed from the same tropical wave that had previously spawned Atlantic Tropical Storm Bret.) about 240 mi (390 km) southeast of Acapulco, Guerrero. (Note: Due to the threat the developing system posed to southwestern Mexico, the National Hurricane Center initiated advisories on it, designating it Potential Tropical Cyclone Two-E at 03:00 UTC on June 29.)
- 12:00 UTC (7:00 a.m. CDT) at 14.3°N 98.2°W – Tropical Depression Two‑E strengthens into Tropical Storm Beatriz about 205 mi (335 km) south-southeast of Acapulco.

June 30

- 06:00 UTC (12:00 a.m. MDT) at 16.7°N 111.4°W – Hurricane Adrian intensifies to Category 2 strength about 540 mi (870 km) west-southwest of Manzanillo.
- 12:00 UTC (6:00 a.m. MDT) at 17.0°N 111.9°W – Hurricane Adrian reaches its peak intensity, with maximum sustained winds of 105 mph (165 km/h) and a minimum central pressure of 970 mbar (28.64 inHg), about 565 mi (905 km) west-southwest of Manzanillo.
- 12:00 UTC (7:00 a.m. CDT) at 16.8°N 101.8°W – Tropical Storm Beatriz strengthens into a Category 1 hurricane about 195 mi (315 km) southeast of Manzanillo, Colima.
- 18:00 UTC (4:00 p.m. CDT) at 17.5°N 102.7°W – Hurricane Beatriz reaches its peak intensity, with maximum sustained winds of 85 mph (140 km/h) and a minimum central pressure of 992 mbar (29.29 inHg), about 115 mi (185 km) southeast of Manzanillo.

=== July ===
July 1

- 00:00 UTC (6:00 p.m. MDT, June 30) at 17.6°N 113.1°W – Hurricane Adrian weakens to Category 1 strength about 635 mi (1,020 km) west-southwest of Manzanillo.
- 06:00 UTC (1:00 a.m. CDT) at 19.2°N 104.6°W – Hurricane Beatriz weakens into a tropical storm while making landfall 5 mi (10 km) west of Manzanillo International Airport with sustained winds of 65 mph (100 km/h) and a central pressure of 999 mbar (29.50 inHg), then quickly dissipates.
- 12:00 UTC (6:00 a.m. MDT) at 18.2°N 114.2°W – Hurricane Adrian weakens into a tropical storm about 695 mi (1,120 km) west of Manzanillo.

July 2

- 12:00 UTC (5:00 a.m. PDT) at 19.4°N 116.4°W – Tropical Storm Adrian degenerates into a remnant low about 835 mi (1,345 km) west-northwest of Manzanillo, and subsequently dissipates.

July 11

- 06:00 UTC (12:00 a.m. MDT) at 11.7°N 104.2°W – Tropical Storm Calvin forms from a disturbance in the eastern Pacific monsoon trough about 450 mi (720 km) south-southwest of Zihuatanejo, Guerrero.

July 13

- 12:00 UTC (5:00 a.m. PDT) at 12.5°N 116.6°W – Tropical Storm Calvin strengthens into a Category 1 hurricane about 840 mi (1,350 km) southwest of the southern tip of the Baja California peninsula.

July 14

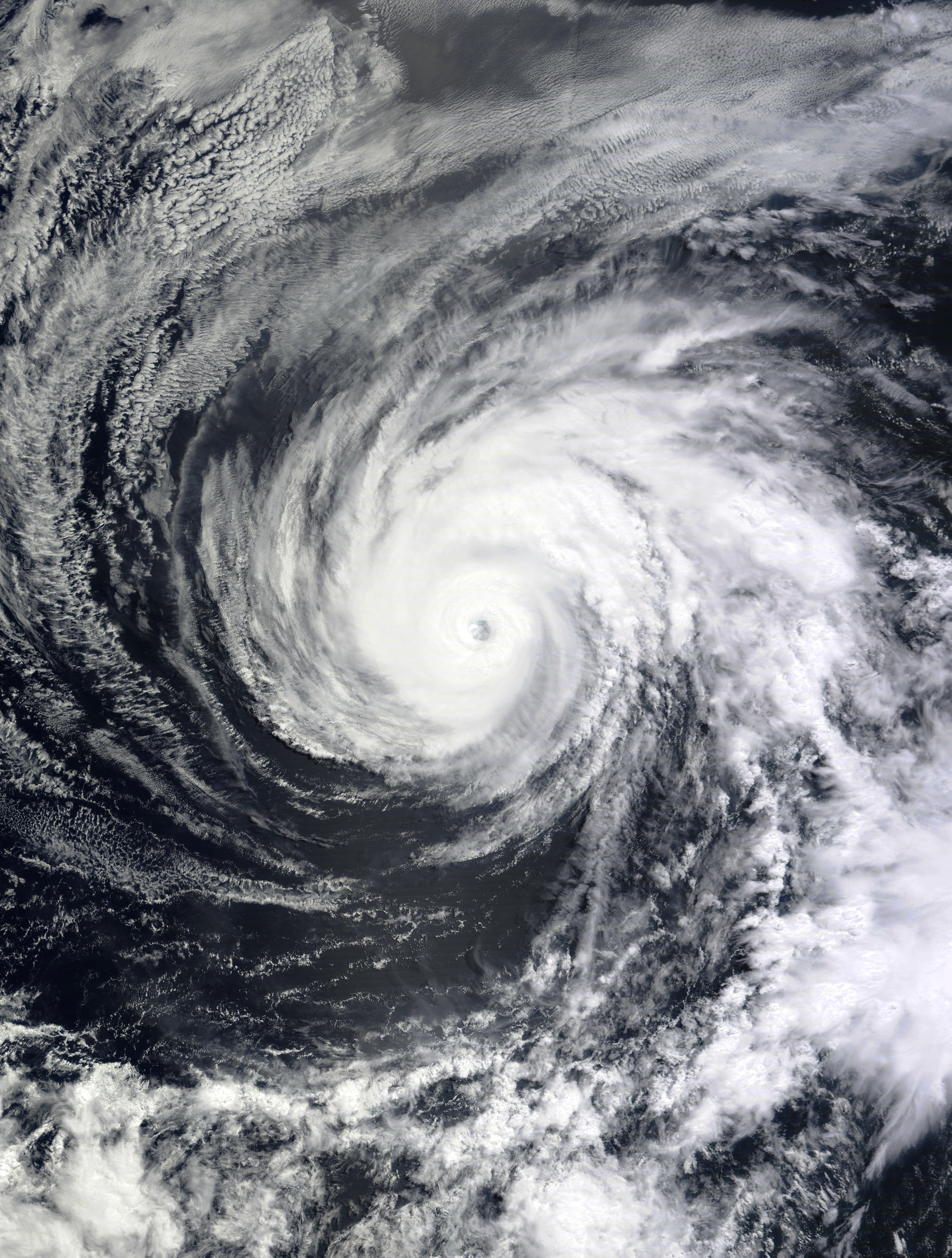
Satellite image of Hurricane Calvin at peak intensity on July 14

- 00:00 UTC (5:00 p.m. PDT, July 13) at 13.0°N 119.7°W – Hurricane Calvin intensifies to Category 2 strength about 940 mi (1,510 km) southwest of the southern tip of the Baja California peninsula.
- 12:00 UTC (5:00 a.m. PDT) at 13.4°N 122.6°W – Hurricane Calvin intensifies to Category 3 strength about 1,060 mi (1,705 km) southwest of the southern tip of the Baja California peninsula, making it the first major hurricane of the season.
- 18:00 UTC (11:00 a.m. PDT) at 13.7°N 123.9°W – Hurricane Calvin reaches its peak intensity, with maximum sustained winds of 125 mph (205 km/h) and a minimum central pressure of 953 mbar (28.14 inHg), about 1,115 mi (1,795 km) west-southwest of the southern tip of the Baja California Peninsula.

July 15

- 06:00 UTC (11:00 p.m. PDT, July 14) at 14.4°N 126.7°W – Hurricane Calvin weakens to Category 2 strength about 1,310 mi (2,110 km) west-southwest of the southern tip of the Baja California peninsula.

July 16

- 00:00 UTC (5:00 p.m. PDT, July 15) at 15.2°N 131.2°W – Hurricane Calvin weakens to Category 1 strength about 1,635 mi (2,630 km) southeast of Ka Lae, the southernmost point of the Big Island of Hawaii.
- 18:00 UTC (11:00 a.m. PDT) at 16.0°N 135.6°W – Hurricane Calvin weakens into a tropical storm about 1,340 mi (2,160 km) southeast of Ka Lae.

July 17

- 12:00 UTC (2:00 a.m. HST) at 16.7°N 140.5°W – Tropical Storm Calvin enters the Central Pacific basin about 1,015 mi (1,630 km) southeast of Ka Lae.

July 19

- 18:00 UTC (8:00 a.m. HST) at 17.9°N 157.7°W – Tropical Storm Calvin degenerates into a remnant low about 150 mi (240 km) southwest of Ka Lae, and later dissipates.

July 20

- 12:00 UTC (5:00 a.m. PDT) at 12.8°N 119.6°W – Tropical Depression Four‑E forms.

July 21

- 00:00 UTC (5:00 p.m. PDT, July 20) at 13.7°N 121.0°W – Tropical Depression Four‑E reaches its peak intensity, with maximum sustained winds of 35 mph (55 km/h) and a minimum central pressure of 1006 mbar (29.71 inHg).

July 22

- 00:00 UTC (5:00 p.m. PDT, July 21) at 16.0°N 126.1°W – Tropical Depression Four‑E degenerates into a remnant low.

July 31

- 18:00 UTC (1:00 p.m. CDT) at 14.8°N 103.7°W – Tropical Depression Five‑E forms from a tropical wave about 290 mi (465 km) south of Manzanillo, Colima.

=== August ===
August 1

- 06:00 UTC (12:00 a.m. MDT) at 15.8°N 106.4°W – Tropical Depression Five‑E strengthens into Tropical Storm Dora about 265 mi (425 km) south-southwest of Manzanillo.

August 2

- 00:00 UTC (6:00 p.m. MDT, August 1) at 16.1°N 110.6°W – Tropical Storm Dora strengthens into a Category 1 hurricane about 460 mi (740 km) west-southwest of Manzanillo.
- 12:00 UTC (6:00 a.m. MDT) at 15.7°N 113.5°W – Hurricane Dora intensifies to Category 2 strength about 545 mi (880 km) south-southwest of the southern tip of the Baja California peninsula.

August 3

- 00:00 UTC (5:00 p.m. PDT, August 2) at 15.3°N 116.2°W – Hurricane Dora intensifies to Category 3 strength about 660 mi (1,065 km) southwest of the southern tip of the Baja California peninsula, making it the second major hurricane of the season.
- 06:00 UTC (11:00 p.m. PDT, August 2) at 15.1°N 117.7°W – Hurricane Dora intensifies to Category 4 strength about 735 mi (1,185 km) southwest of the southern tip of the Baja California peninsula.
- 12:00 UTC (5:00 a.m. PDT) at 14.9°N 119.3°W – Hurricane Dora weakens to Category 3 strength about 825 mi (1,325 km) southwest of the southern tip of the Baja California peninsula.

August 4

- 00:00 UTC (5:00 p.m. PDT, August 3) at 14.2°N 122.6°W – Hurricane Dora re-intensifies to Category 4 strength about 1,020 mi (1,640 km) southwest of the southern tip of the Baja California peninsula.
- 12:00 UTC (8:00 a.m. PDT) at 14.0°N 126.1°W – Hurricane Dora weakens to Category 3 strength about 1,220 mi (1,965 km) west-southwest of the southern tip of the Baja California peninsula.

August 5

- 00:00 UTC (5:00 p.m. PDT, August 4) at 13.7°N 129.3°W – Hurricane Dora weakens to Category 2 strength about 1,415 mi (2,280 km) west-southwest of the southern tip of the Baja California peninsula.
- 12:00 UTC (6:00 a.m. MDT) at 17.9°N 106.3°W – Tropical Depression Six‑E forms from a tropical wave.
- 18:00 UTC (11:00 a.m. PDT) at 13.3°N 134.0°W – Hurricane Dora rapidly re-intensifies to Category 4 strength about 1,710 mi (2,750 km) west-southwest of the southern tip of the Baja California peninsula.
- 18:00 UTC (12:00 p.m. MDT) at 18.7°N 107.3°W – Tropical Depression Six‑E strengthens into Tropical Storm Eugene.

August 6

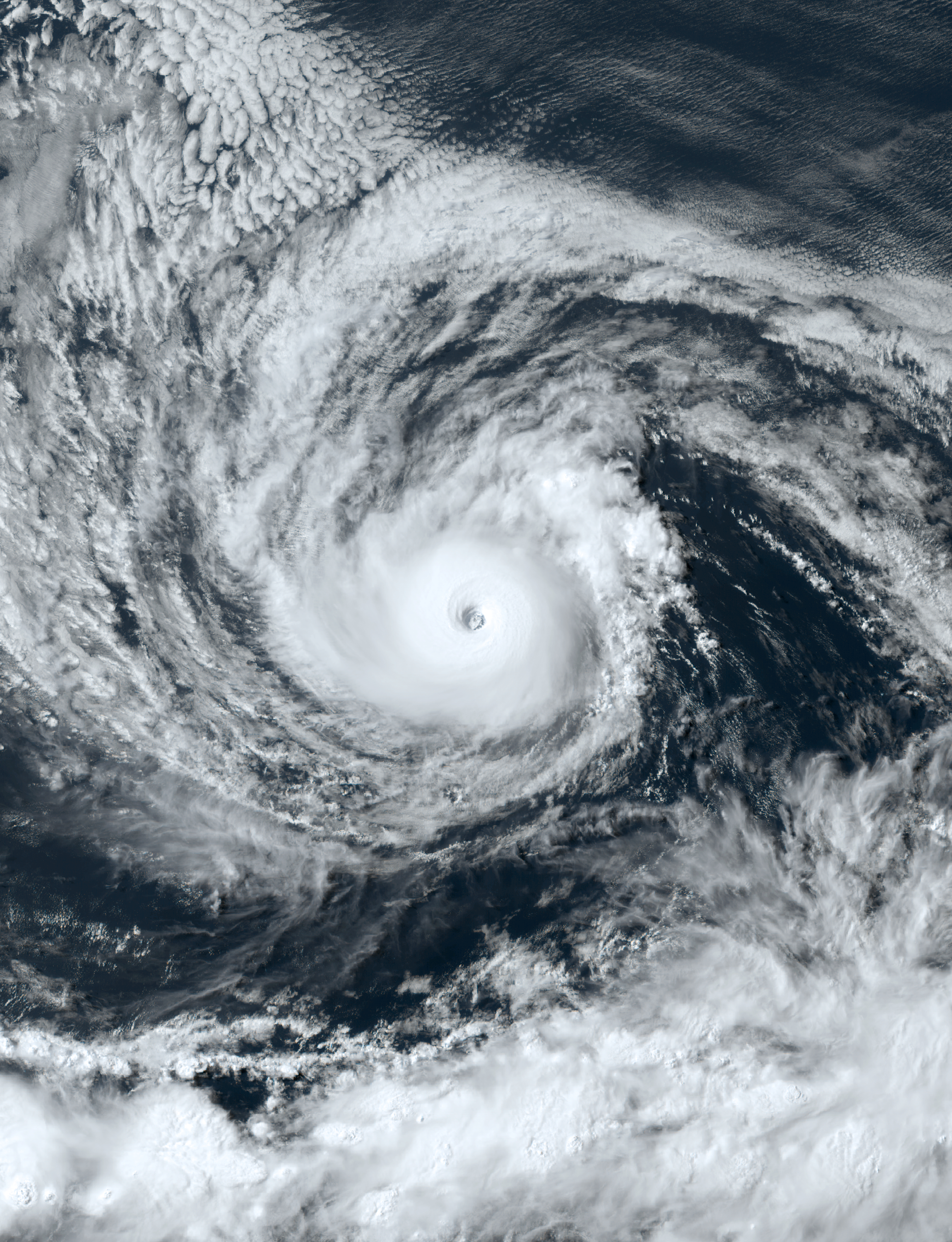
Satellite image of Hurricane Dora at peak intensity early on August 6

- 00:00 UTC (5:00 p.m. PDT, August 5) at 13.2°N 135.6°W – Hurricane Dora reaches its peak intensity, with maximum sustained winds of 150 mph (240 km/h) and a minimum central pressure of 939 mbar (27.73 inHg), about 1,805 mi (2,910 km) west-southwest of the southern tip of the Baja California peninsula.
- 12:00 UTC (6:00 a.m. MDT) at 21.3°N 110.6°W – Tropical Storm Eugene reaches its peak intensity, with maximum sustained winds of 70 mph (110 km/h) and a minimum central pressure of 992 mbar (29.29 inHg).
- ~15:00 UTC (5:00 a.m. HST) at 12.9°N 141.2°W – Hurricane Dora enters the Central Pacific basin about 1,255 mi (2,020 km) east-southeast of Hawaii. (Note: The position is as of 18:00 UTC (8:00 a.m. HST) on August 6.)

August 7

- 12:00 UTC (5:00 a.m. PDT) at 24.3°N 124.5°W – Tropical Storm Eugene degenerates into a remnant low.

August 10

- 12:00 UTC (2:00 a.m. HST) at 12.1°N 170.5°W – Hurricane Dora weakens to Category 3 strength south of Johnston Atoll.

August 11

- 18:00 UTC (8:00 a.m. HST) at 14.8°N 178.6°W – Hurricane Dora weakens to Category 2 strength.

August 12

- 00:00 UTC (09:00 JST) at 15.6°N 179.8°W – Hurricane Dora briefly re-intensifies to Category 3 strength very near the International Date Line; upon crossing Date Line, Dora exits the Central Pacific basin and is redesignated as a typhoon.
- 12:00 UTC (6:00 a.m. MDT) at 14.2°N 111.8°W – Tropical Depression Seven‑E forms from a tropical wave.

August 13

- 00:00 UTC (6:00 p.m. MDT, August 12) at 15.0°N 113.6°W – Tropical Depression Seven‑E strengthens into Tropical Storm Fernanda.
- 18:00 UTC (11:00 a.m. PDT) at 15.3°N 116.1°E – Tropical Storm Fernanda strengthens into a Category 1 hurricane.

August 14

- 00:00 UTC (5:00 p.m. PDT, August 13) at 15.4°N 116.8°W – Hurricane Fernanda intensifies to Category 2 strength.
- 00:00 UTC (5:00 p.m. PDT, August 13) at 11.3°N 138.2°W – Tropical Depression Eight‑E forms.
- 06:00 UTC (11:00 p.m. PDT, August 13) at 15.5°N 117.4°W – Hurricane Fernanda intensifies to Category 3 strength, making it the third major hurricane of the season.
- 06:00 UTC (11:00 p.m. PDT, August 13) at 11.3°N 139.2°W – Tropical Depression Eight‑E strengthens into Tropical Storm Greg, then later enters the Central Pacific basin.
- 12:00 UTC (5:00 a.m. PDT) at 15.6°N 118.0°W – Hurricane Fernanda intensifies to Category 4 strength; it simultaneously reaches its peak intensity, with maximum sustained winds of 130 mph (215 km/h) and a minimum central pressure of 949 mbar (28.02 inHg).

August 15

- 00:00 UTC (5:00 p.m. PDT, August 14) at 16.5°N 119.4°W – Hurricane Fernanda weakens to Category 3 strength.
- 06:00 UTC (8:00 p.m. HST, August 14) at 11.1°N 144.0°W – Tropical Storm Greg reaches its peak intensity, with maximum sustained winds of 50 mph (85 km/h) and a minimum central pressure of 1000 mbar (29.53 inHg), southeast of Hilo, Hawaii.
- 12:00 UTC (5:00 a.m. PDT) at 16.8°N 121.2°W – Hurricane Fernanda weakens to Category 2 strength.

August 16

- 06:00 UTC (11:00 p.m. PDT, August 15) at 17.2°N 124.8°W – Hurricane Fernanda weakens to Category 1 strength.
- 06:00 UTC (1:00 a.m. CDT) at 11.9°N 100.8°W – A tropical depression forms from a tropical wave about 345 mi (555 km) south of Acapulco, Guerrero.
- 12:00 UTC (5:00 a.m. PDT) at 17.0°N 126.1°W – Hurricane Fernanda weakens into a tropical storm.
- 12:00 UTC (7:00 a.m. CDT) at 12.6°N 102.3°W – The tropical depression strengthens into Tropical Storm Hilary about 335 mi (535 km) southwest of Acapulco.

August 17

- 06:00 UTC (11:00 p.m. PDT, August 16) at 16.5°N 129.9°W – Tropical Storm Fernanda degenerates into a remnant low, and subsequently dissipates.
- 12:00 UTC (6:00 a.m. MDT) at 15.2°N 107.2°W – Tropical Storm Hilary strengthens into a Category 1 hurricane about 330 mi (530 km) southwest of Manzanillo, Colima.
- 18:00 UTC (12:00 p.m. MDT) at 15.8°N 108.4°W – Hurricane Hilary intensifies to Category 2 strength about 350 mi (565 km) southwest of Manzanillo.
- 18:00 UTC (8:00 a.m. HST) at 12.2°N 156.3°W – Tropical Storm Greg weakens into a tropical depression south of the island of Hawaii, and later degenerates into a remnant low.

August 18

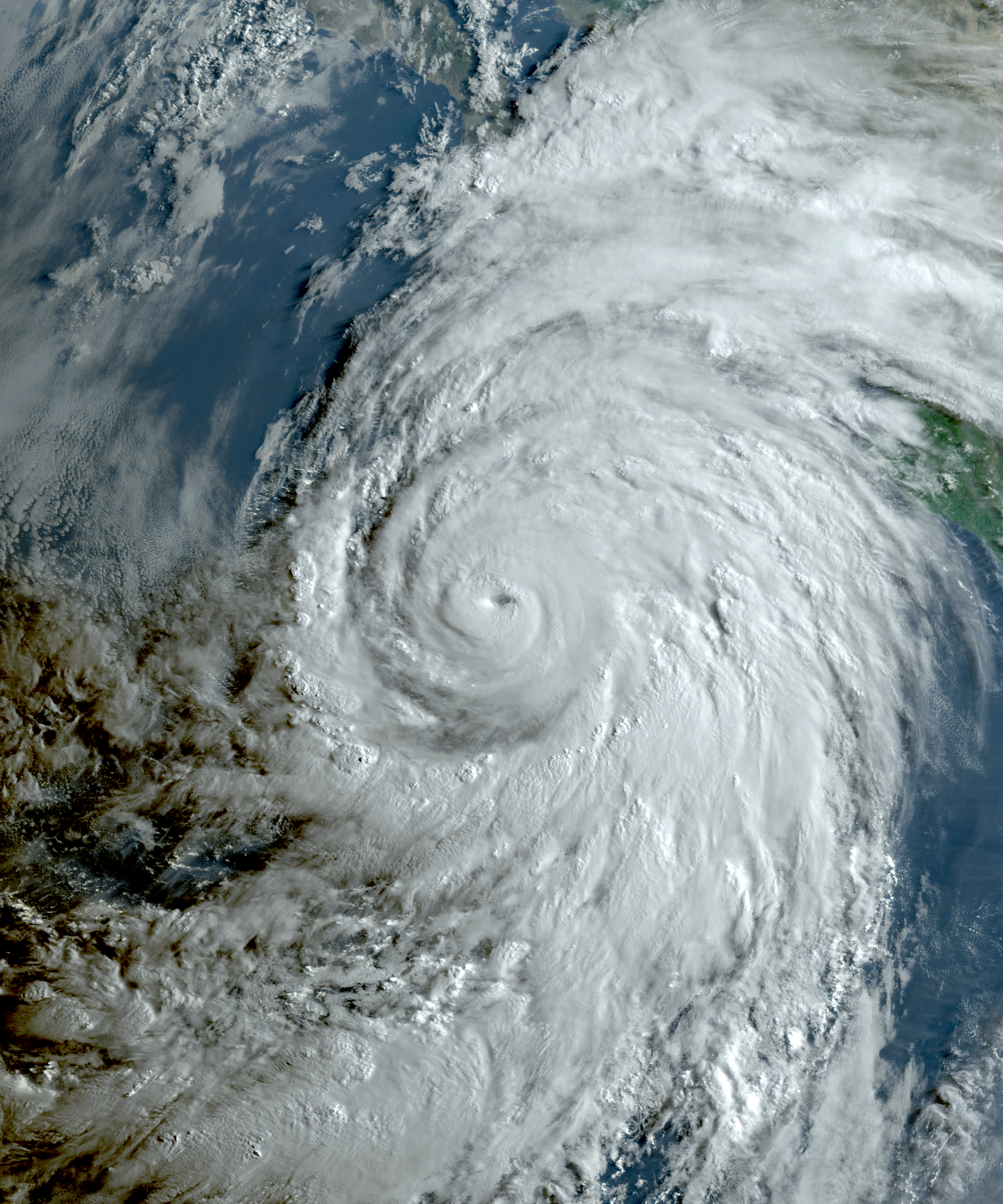
Satellite image of Hurricane Hilary at Category 4 strength while paralleling the coast of Mexico on August 18

- 00:00 UTC (6:00 p.m. MDT, August 17) at 16.4°N 109.5°W – Hurricane Hilary intensifies to Category 3 strength about 385 mi (620 km) west-southwest of Manzanillo, making it the fourth major hurricane of the season.
- 06:00 UTC (12:00 a.m. MDT) at 16.8°N 110.4°W – Hurricane Hilary intensifies to Category 4 strength about 430 mi (695 km) west-southwest of Manzanillo; it simultaneously reaches its peak intensity, with maximum sustained winds of 140 mph (220 km/h) and a minimum central pressure of 940 mbar (27.76 inHg).
- 18:00 UTC (12:00 p.m. MDT) at 18.2°N 111.9°W – Hurricane Hilary weakens to Category 3 strength about 500 mi (805 km) west of Manzanillo.

August 19

- 00:00 UTC (6:00 p.m. MDT, August 18) at 19.2°N 112.6°W – Hurricane Hilary re-intensifies to Category 4 strength about 540 mi (870 km) west of Manzanillo.
- 12:00 UTC (6:00 a.m. MDT) at 21.5°N 113.5°W – Hurricane Hilary weakens to Category 3 strength about 450 mi (720 km) south-southeast of Punta Eugenia, Baja California Sur.
- 18:00 UTC (12:00 p.m. MDT) at 22.9°N 113.9°W – Hurricane Hilary weakens to Category 2 strength about 350 mi (565 km) south of Punta Eugenia.

August 20

- 00:00 UTC (6:00 p.m. MDT, August 19) at 24.3°N 114.3°W – Hurricane Hilary weakens to Category 1 strength about 245 mi (400 km) south of Punta Eugenia.
- 12:00 UTC (5:00 a.m. PDT) at 28.1°N 115.3°W – Hurricane Hilary weakens into a tropical storm near Isla Cedros, about 25 mi (35 km) northwest of Punta Eugenia.
- 17:00 UTC (10:00 a.m. PDT) at 29.7°N 115.6°W – Tropical Storm Hilary makes landfall with sustained winds of 60 mph (95 km/h) and a central pressure of 990 mbar (29.23 inHg) near San Fernando, Baja California.
- 21:00 UTC (2:00 p.m. PDT) at 31.4°N 116.1°W – Tropical Storm Hilary degenerates into a post-tropical cyclone inland over northern Baja California, and is soon absorbed by a non-tropical low.

August 26

- 18:00 UTC (11:00 a.m. PDT) at 15.5°N 117.9°W – A tropical depression forms from a tropical wave in the west-central eastern Pacific.

August 27

- 12:00 UTC (5:00 a.m. PDT) at 16.6°N 120.0°W – The tropical depression strengthens into Tropical Storm Irwin.

August 29

- 00:00 UTC (5:00 p.m. PDT, August 28) at 19.1°N 125.0°W – Tropical Storm Irwin reaches its peak intensity, with maximum sustained winds of 45 mph (75 km/h) and a minimum central pressure of 998 mbar (29.47 inHg).
- 12:00 UTC (5:00 a.m. PDT) at 19.7°N 128.1°W – Tropical Storm Irwin degenerates into a remnant low, and subsequently dissipates.

=== September ===
September 4

- 18:00 UTC (1:00 p.m. CDT) at 12.3°N 103.8°W – A tropical depression forms over the eastern Pacific from a tropical wave.

September 5

- 06:00 UTC (1:00 a.m. CDT) at 12.4°N 105.9°W – The tropical depression strengthens into Tropical Storm Jova far to the south-southeast of the southern tip of the Baja California peninsula.

September 6

- 06:00 UTC (12:00 a.m. MDT) at 13.3°N 109.0°W – Tropical Storm Jova strengthens into a Category 1 hurricane.
- 12:00 UTC (6:00 a.m. MDT) at 13.9°N 110.0°W – Hurricane Jova intensifies to Category 2 strength.
- 18:00 UTC (12:00 p.m. MDT) at 14.6°N 111.1°W – Hurricane Jova rapidly intensifies to Category 4 strength, making it the fifth major hurricane of the season.

September 7

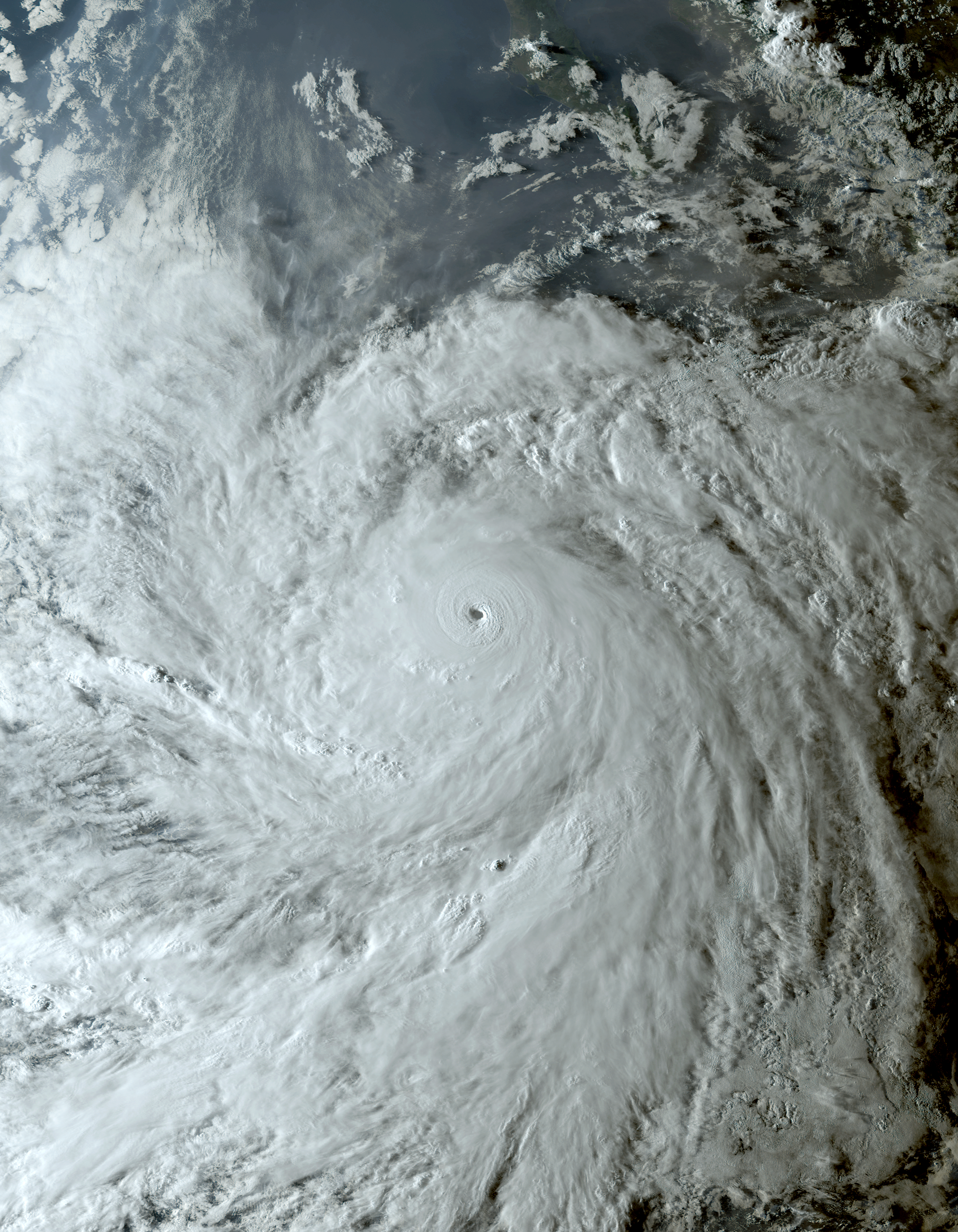
Satellite image of Hurricane Jova at peak intensity early on September 7

- 00:00 UTC (6:00 p.m. MDT, September 6) at 15.3°N 112.4°W – Hurricane Jova intensifies to Category 5 strength; it simultaneously reaches its peak intensity, with maximum sustained winds of 160 mph (260 km/h) and a minimum central pressure of 926 mbar (27.34 inHg).
- 12:00 UTC (5:00 a.m. PDT) at 16.8°N 115.0°W – Hurricane Jova weakens to Category 4 strength.

September 8

- 06:00 UTC (11:00 p.m. PDT, September 7) at 18.8°N 119.1°W – Hurricane Jova weakens to Category 3 strength.
- 12:00 UTC (5:00 a.m. PDT) at 19.5°N 120.6°W – Hurricane Jova weakens to Category 2 strength.
- 18:00 UTC (11:00 a.m. PDT) at 20.1°N 121.9°W – Hurricane Jova weakens to Category 1 strength.

September 9

- 06:00 UTC (11:00 p.m. PDT, September 8) at 21.2°N 124.2°W – Hurricane Jova weakens into a tropical storm.

September 10

- 06:00 UTC (11:00 p.m. PDT, September 9) at 23.8°N 126.6°W – Tropical Storm Jova degenerates into a remnant low.

September 15

- 12:00 UTC (5:00 a.m. PDT) at 15.0°N 135.3°W – Tropical Depression Twelve‑E forms from a tropical wave.
- 18:00 UTC (11:00 a.m. PDT) at 15.0°N 135.8°W – Tropical Depression Twelve‑E reaches its peak intensity, with maximum sustained winds of 35 mph (55 km/h) and a minimum central pressure of 1006 mbar (29.71 inHg).

September 17

- ~00:00 UTC (2:00 p.m. HST, September 16) at 13.8°N 140.3°W – Tropical Depression Twelve‑E enters the Central Pacific basin.

September 18

- 06:00 UTC (8:00 p.m. HST, September 17) at 12.3°N 146.5°W – Tropical Depression Twelve‑E degenerates into a remnant low far southeast of the Big Island of Hawaii, and later dissipates.

September 19

- 06:00 UTC (11:00 p.m. PDT, September 18) at 14.4°N 117.5°W – A tropical depression forms southwest of the southern tip of the Baja California peninsula.
- 12:00 UTC (5:00 a.m. PDT) at 14.7°N 118.8°W – The tropical depression strengthens into Tropical Storm Kenneth southwest of the southern tip of the Baja California peninsula.

September 21

- 00:00 UTC (5:00 p.m. PDT, September 20) at 16.3°N 124.5°W – Tropical Storm Kenneth reaches its peak intensity, with maximum sustained winds of 50 mph (85 km/h) and a minimum central pressure of 1000 mbar (29.53 inHg), west-southwest of the southern tip of the Baja California peninsula.

September 22

- 06:00 UTC (11:00 p.m. PDT, September 21) at 18.8°N 126.1°W – Tropical Storm Kenneth weakens into a tropical depression west of the southern tip of the Baja California peninsula.
- 12:00 UTC (5:00 a.m. PDT) at 20.0°N 125.9°W – Tropical Depression Kenneth degenerates into a remnant low west of the southern tip of the Baja California peninsula, and subsequently dissipates.

September 23

- 12:00 UTC (5:00 a.m. PDT) at 13.6°N 118.5°W – Tropical Depression Fourteen‑E forms from a tropical wave about 865 mi (1,390 km) southwest of the southern tip of the Baja California peninsula.
- 18:00 UTC (11:00 a.m. PDT) at 14.0°N 119.7°W – Tropical Depression Fourteen‑E reaches its peak intensity, with maximum sustained winds of 35 mph (55 km/h) and a minimum central pressure of 1006 mbar (29.71 inHg), about 885 mi (1,425 km) southwest of the southern tip of the Baja California peninsula.

September 25

- 00:00 UTC (5:00 p.m. PDT, September 24) at 15.1°N 125.9°W – Tropical Depression Fourteen‑E degenerates into a remnant low about 1,170 mi (1,880 km) west-southwest of the southern tip of the Baja California peninsula.

=== October ===
October 3

- 00:00 UTC (7:00 p.m. CDT, October 2) at 11.2°N 105.8°W – A tropical depression forms from a tropical wave about 575 mi (925 km) south of Manzanillo, Colima.
- 06:00 UTC (12:00 a.m. MDT) at 11.5°N 106.4°W – The tropical depression strengthens into Tropical Storm Lidia about 540 mi (870 km) south-southwest of Manzanillo.

October 8

- 18:00 UTC (1:00 p.m. CDT) at 15.5°N 101.5°W – Tropical Depression Sixteen‑E forms from an area of unsettled weather about 145 mi (230 km) south of Zihuatanejo, Guerrero. (Note: Due to the threat the developing system posed to southern Mexico, the National Hurricane Center initiated advisories on it, designating it Potential Tropical Cyclone Sixteen-E at 03:00 UTC on October 8 (10:00 p.m. CDT on October 7).)

October 9

- 00:00 UTC (7:00 p.m. CDT, October 8) at 16.1°N 101.6°W – Tropical Depression Sixteen‑E strengthens into Tropical Storm Max about 110 mi (175 km) south of Zihuatanejo.
- 18:00 UTC (12:00 p.m. MDT) at 17.8°N 111.4°W – Tropical Storm Lidia strengthens into a Category 1 hurricane about 445 mi (715 km) southwest of Puerto Vallarta, Jalisco.
- 18:00 UTC (1:00 p.m. CDT) at 17.3°N 101.1°W – Tropical Storm Max reaches its peak intensity, with maximum sustained winds of 70 mph (110 km/h) and a minimum central pressure of 990 mbar (29.23 inHg), and simultaneously makes landfall near Puerto Vicente, Guerrero.

October 10

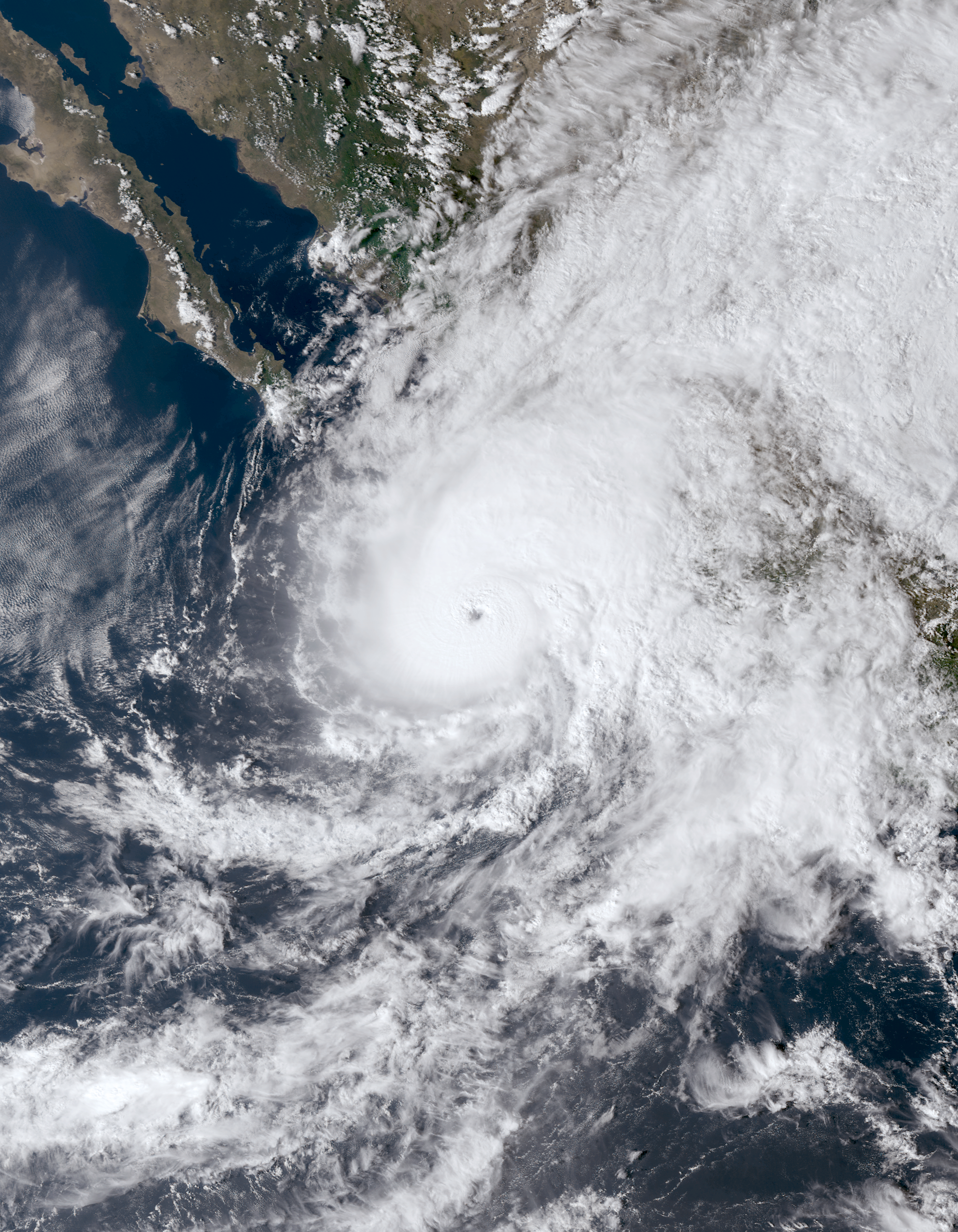
Satellite image of Hurricane Lidia shortly before landfall in Jalisco on October 10

- 00:00 UTC (7:00 p.m. CDT, October 9) at 17.9°N 100.8°W – Tropical Storm Max is last noted inland about 50 mi (85 km) east-northeast of Zihuatanejo with sustained winds of 40 mph (65 km/h) and a central pressure of 1000 mbar (29.53 inHg); it dissipates shortly thereafter.
- 18:00 UTC (12:00 p.m. MDT) at 19.3°N 107.1°W – Hurricane Lidia rapidly intensifies to Category 3 strength about 150 mi (240 km) southwest of Puerto Vallarta, making it the sixth major hurricane of the season.

October 11

- 00:00 UTC (7:00 p.m. CDT, October 10) at 20.1°N 105.5°W – Hurricane Lidia intensifies to Category 4 strength and simultaneously reaches its peak intensity, with maximum sustained winds of 140 mph (220 km/h) and a minimum central pressure of 942 mbar (27.82 inHg), while making landfall near Las Peñitas, Jalisco, about 40 mi (65 km) southwest of Puerto Vallarta.
- 06:00 UTC (1:00 a.m. CDT) at 21.7°N 103.5°W – Hurricane Lidia rapidly weakens into a tropical storm inland about 130 miles (215 km) northeast of Puerto Vallarta.
- 12:00 UTC (7:00 a.m. CDT) at 24.5°N 100.5°W – Tropical Storm Lidia degenerates into a remnant low inland over northern Mexico, about 405 mi (650 km) northeast of Puerto Vallarta, and later dissipates.

October 17

- 12:00 UTC (7:00 a.m. CDT) at 12.7°N 105.8°W – A tropical depression forms as a result of interaction between an area of convection within the eastern Pacific monsoon trough and a Tehuantepec gap wind event about 450 mi (720 km) south-southwest of Manzanillo, Colima.
- 18:00 UTC (12:00 p.m. MDT) at 12.9°N 106.9°W – The tropical depression strengthens into Tropical Storm Norma about 460 mi (740 km) south-southwest of Manzanillo.

October 18

- 18:00 UTC (12:00 p.m. MDT) at 15.3°N 107.9°W – Tropical Storm Norma strengthens into a Category 1 hurricane about 540 mi (870 km) south-southeast of Cabo San Lucas, Baja California Sur.

October 19

- 06:00 UTC (12:00 a.m. MDT) at 16.4°N 107.8°W – Hurricane Norma rapidly intensifies to Category 3 strength about 465 mi (750 km) south-southeast of Cabo San Lucas, making it the seventh major hurricane of the season.
- 12:00 UTC (6:00 a.m. MDT) at 16.9°N 107.7°W – Hurricane Norma intensifies to Category 4 strength about 435 mi (705 km) south-southeast of Cabo San Lucas; it simultaneously reaches its peak intensity, with maximum sustained winds of 130 mph (215 km/h) and a minimum central pressure of 939 mbar (27.73 inHg).
- 18:00 UTC (12:00 p.m. MDT) at 17.3°N 108.0°W – Hurricane Norma weakens to Category 3 strength about 405 mi (650 km) south-southeast of Cabo San Lucas.

October 21

- 12:00 UTC (6:00 a.m. MDT) at 22.3°N 110.2°W – Hurricane Norma weakens to Category 2 strength about 40 mi (65 km) south-southwest of Cabo San Lucas.
- 18:00 UTC (12:00 p.m. MDT) at 22.9°N 110.3°W – Hurricane Norma weakens to Category 1 strength about 25 mi (35 km) west of Cabo San Lucas.
- 20:15 UTC (2:15 p.m. MDT) at 23.0°N 110.1°W – Hurricane Norma makes its first landfall about 10 mi (20 km) northwest of Cabo San Lucas with sustained winds of 80 mph (130 km/h) and a central pressure of 978 mbar (28.88 inHg).

October 22

- 00:00 UTC (6:00 p.m. MDT, October 21) at 23.6°N 110.1°W – Hurricane Norma weakens into a tropical storm inland about 50 mi (85 km) north-northwest of Cabo San Lucas and soon emerges over the Gulf of California.
- 12:00 UTC (7:00 a.m. CDT) at 9.8°N 96.7°W – A tropical depression forms from an area of low pressure about 535 mi (860 km) south-southeast of Acapulco, Guerrero.
- 18:00 UTC (1:00 p.m. CDT) at 10.2°N 96.9°W – The tropical depression strengthens into Tropical Storm Otis about 500 mi (805 km) south-southeast of Acapulco.

October 23

- 10:30 UTC (4:30 a.m. MDT) at 24.7°N 108.0°W – Tropical Storm Norma weakens into a tropical depression and makes its second and final landfall near El Dorado, Sinaloa, with sustained winds of 35 mph (55 km/h) and a central pressure of 999 mbar (29.50 inHg).
- 12:00 UTC (6:00 a.m. MDT) at 24.7°N 107.9°W – Tropical Depression Norma degenerates into a remnant low inland near El Dorado, and quickly dissipates.

October 24

- 12:00 UTC (7:00 a.m. CDT) at 14.2°N 98.9°W – Tropical Storm Otis strengthens into a Category 1 hurricane about 190 mi (305 km) south-southeast of Acapulco.
- 18:00 UTC (1:00 p.m. CDT) at 14.9°N 99.4°W – Hurricane Otis rapidly intensifies to Category 3 strength about 130 mi (215 km) south-southeast of Acapulco, making it the eighth and final major hurricane of the season.

October 25

Enhanced infrared imagery of Hurricane Otis making landfall near Acapulco on October 25

- 00:00 UTC (7:00 p.m. CDT, October 24) at 15.7°N 99.6°W – Hurricane Otis intensifies to Category 4 strength about 80 mi (130 km) south-southeast of Acapulco.
- 03:00 UTC (10:00 p.m. CDT, October 24) at 16.1°N 99.7°W – Hurricane Otis intensifies to Category 5 strength about 60 mi (95 km) south-southeast of Acapulco; it simultaneously reaches its peak intensity, with maximum sustained winds of 165 mph (270 km/h) and a minimum central pressure of 922 mbar (27.23 inHg), making it the strongest storm of the season.
- 06:45 UTC (1:45 a.m. CDT) at 16.8°N 99.9°W – Hurricane Otis makes landfall in Acapulco with sustained winds of 160 mph (260 km/h) and a central pressure of 929 mbar (27.43 inHg). (Note: Otis was the first Pacific hurricane on record to make landfall at Category 5 intensity, thus becoming the strongest hurricane to make landfall on the Pacific coast of Mexico.)
- 12:00 UTC (7:00 a.m. CDT) at 17.7°N 100.3°W – Hurricane Otis rapidly weakens to Category 2 strength inland about 65 mi (100 km) north-northwest of Acapulco.
- 18:00 UTC (1:00 p.m. CDT) at 18.6°N 100.7°W – Hurricane Otis rapidly weakens into a tropical storm inland about 130 mi (215 km) north-northwest of Acapulco, and soon dissipates.

October 28

- 12:00 UTC (7:00 a.m. CDT) at 10.4°N 92.6°W – A tropical depression forms from a tropical wave containing the remnants of Atlantic basin Tropical Depression Twenty‑One about 290 mi (465 km) southwest of San Salvador, El Salvador.

October 30

- 00:00 UTC (7:00 p.m. CDT, October 29) at 10.8°N 92.3°W – The tropical depression strengthens into Tropical Storm Pilar about 255 mi (405 km) west-southwest of San Salvador.

=== November ===
November 1

- 00:00 UTC (7:00 p.m. CDT, October 31) at 11.7°N 89.4°W – Tropical Storm Pilar reaches its peak intensity, with maximum sustained winds of 65 mph (100 km/h) and a minimum central pressure of 995 mbar (29.38 inHg), about 90 mi (150 km) off the coast of El Salvador.

November 5

- 18:00 UTC (11:00 a.m. MST) (Note: On November 5, daylight saving time ended in most areas of the basin, which resulted in the gap between UTC and local time widening by one hour. Hawaii was not affected; the state has not observed daylight saving time since 1945.) at 10.5°N 113.9°W – Tropical Storm Pilar degenerates into a remnant low about 890 mi (1,435 km) south-southwest of the southern tip of the Baja California peninsula, and subsequently dissipates.

November 21

- 12:00 UTC (4:00 a.m. PST) at 10.1°N 119.8°W – A tropical depression forms in the west-central eastern Pacific from a monsoon trough disturbance.

November 24

- 12:00 UTC (4:00 a.m. PST) at 13.1°N 122.6°W – The tropical depression strengthens into Tropical Storm Ramon.

November 25

- 18:00 UTC (10:00 a.m. PST) at 15.0°N 122.9°W – Tropical Storm Ramon reaches its peak intensity, with maximum sustained winds of 45 mph (75 km/h) and a minimum central pressure of 1002 mbar (29.59 inHg), roughly 1,000 mi (1,610 km) west-southwest of the southern tip of the Baja California peninsula.

November 26

- 06:00 UTC (10:00 p.m. PST, November 25) at 14.5°N 123.1°W – Tropical Storm Ramon degenerates into a remnant low, and subsequently dissipates.

November 30

- The 2023 Pacific hurricane season officially ends in the Eastern and Central Pacific basins.

== See also ==
- Timeline of the 2023 Atlantic hurricane season
- Tropical cyclones in 2023
- List of Pacific hurricanes
