= Hurricane Dora (2023) =

Category 4 Pacific hurricane and typhoon

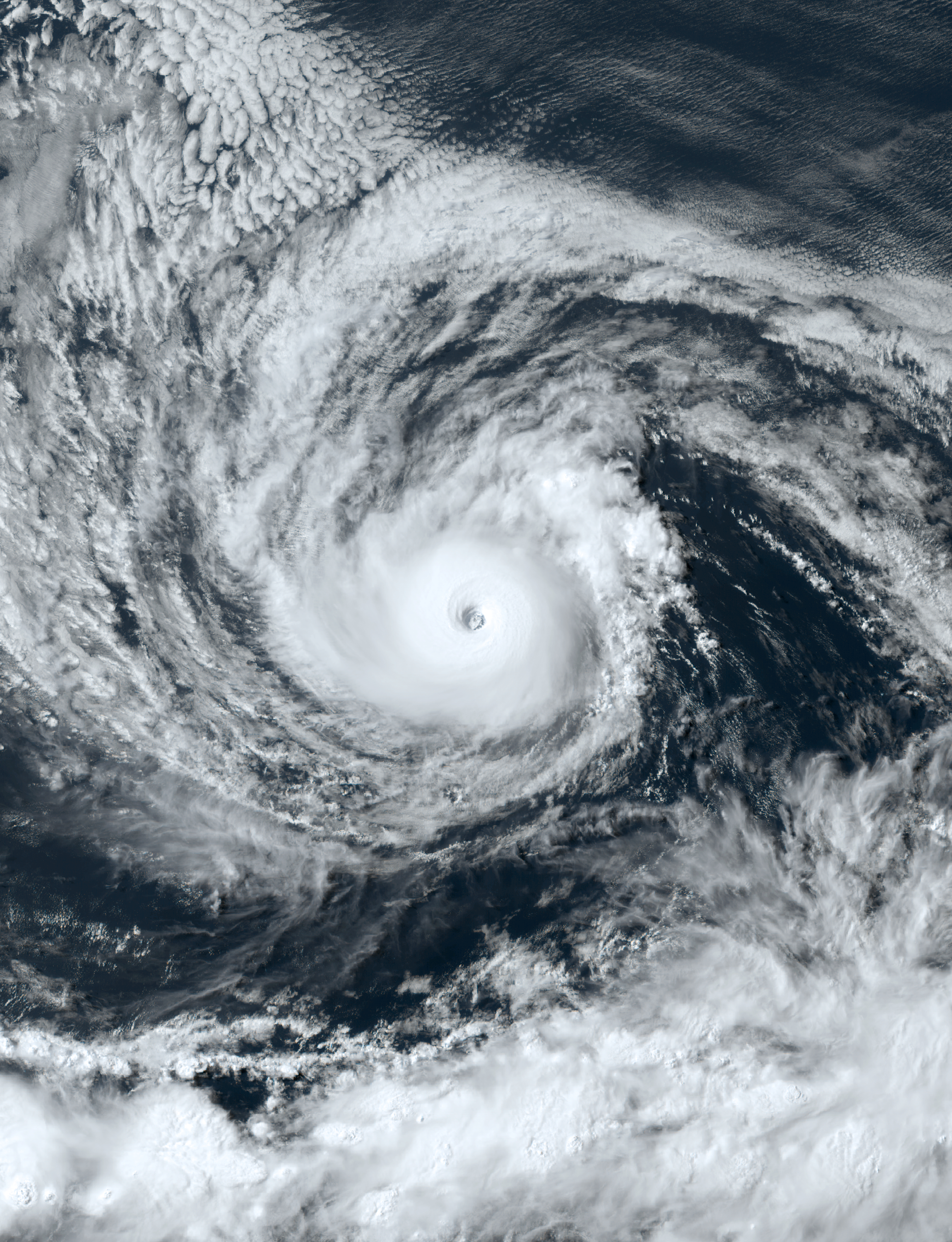
- Hurricane Dora at peak intensity on August 6

Meteorological history
- Formed: July 31, 2023
- Extratropical: August 21, 2023
- Dissipated: August 26, 2023

Category 4 major hurricane
- 1-minute sustained (SSHWS/NWS)
- Highest winds: 150 mph (240 km/h)
- Lowest pressure: 939 mbar (hPa); 27.73 inHg

Overall effects
- Fatalities: None
- Damage: None
- Areas affected: Hawaii, Johnston Atoll, Wake Island
- IBTrACS
- Part of the 2023 Pacific hurricane and typhoon seasons

Hurricane Dora, also known as Typhoon Dora, was a long‑lived and powerful tropical cyclone that tracked across all three North Pacific tropical cyclone basins in August 2023. The fourth named storm, fourth hurricane, and second major hurricane (Note: A major hurricane is a storm that ranks as Category 3 or higher on the Saffir–Simpson hurricane wind scale.) of the 2023 Pacific hurricane season, Dora developed on July 31, from a tropical wave that had crossed over Central America from the North Atlantic, and became a tropical storm early the following day. During August 2–3, the system rapidly intensified to Category 4 strength. The same day, Dora moved into the Central Pacific basin from the East Pacific basin. Dora's annular structure deteriorated, leaving the system susceptible to dry air intrusions, and the hurricane passed south of Johnston Island. Dora weakened to Category 3 strength on the morning of August 10.

The same day, southerly shear degraded the hurricane's structure as it shifted its course toward the west-northwest along the southwest edge of a high pressure system. Dora weakened to Category 2 strength about 900 mi (1,450 km) south of Midway Island. Dora moved westward while a Pacific hurricane, and crossed the International Date Line on August 11, at which time it was reclassified as a typhoon, becoming the second tropical cyclone on record to remain at hurricane strength across all three North Pacific tropical cyclone basins, along with Hurricane John in 1994. As the sixth typhoon of the 2023 Pacific typhoon season, Dora would gradually deteriorate over open waters. As Dora moved north under a mid-latitude upper low, it became strongly influenced by the low and started to exhibit subtropical characteristics, prompting the Joint Typhoon Warning Center (JTWC) to reclassify the storm as a subtropical cyclone at 15:00 UTC on August 18. The agency continued tracking Dora until August 22, when Dora briefly re-entered the Central Pacific basin as a subtropical depression, while the Japan Meteorological Agency (JMA) monitored the cyclone until 06:00 UTC that day.

Hurricane Dora never posed a direct threat to any land mass. However, the storm's high winds south of Hawaii, together with an anticyclone to the north of Hawaii, produced strong gradient winds over the islands, which in turn helped cause the 2023 Hawaii wildfires. Philippe Papin, a hurricane specialist with the National Hurricane Center, argued that Hurricane Dora played only a minor role in "enhancing low-level flow over Maui at fire initiation time." Nonetheless, given Dora's indirect meteorological role in the wildfires and devastation those fires caused, the name Dora was retired following the season, and will never be used again for an eastern Pacific tropical system.

== Meteorological history ==
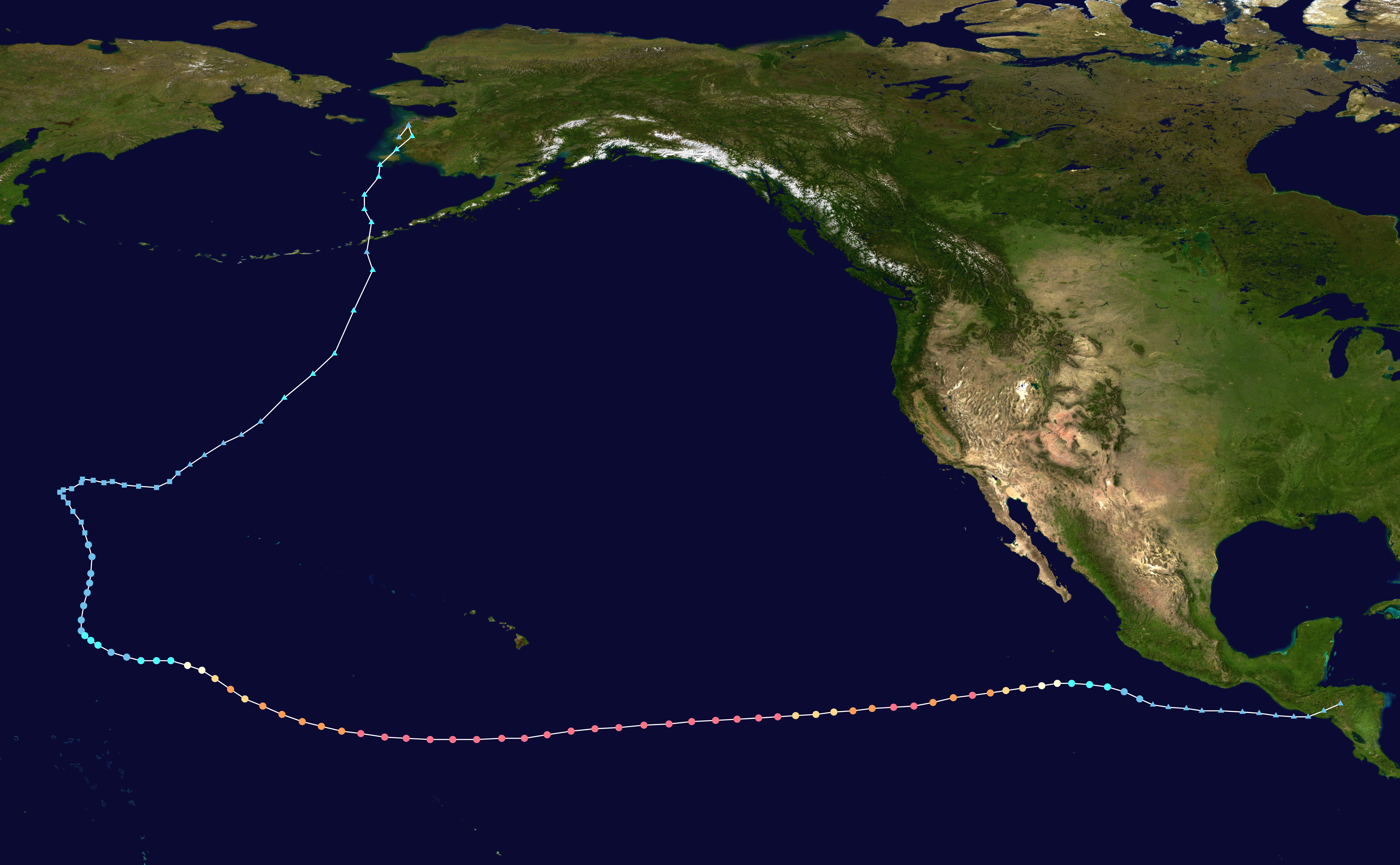
Map plotting the storm's track and intensity, according to the Saffir–Simpson scale Map key Saffir–Simpson scale Tropical depression (≤38 mph, ≤62 km/h) Tropical storm (39–73 mph, 63–118 km/h) Category 1 (74–95 mph, 119–153 km/h) Category 2 (96–110 mph, 154–177 km/h) Category 3 (111–129 mph, 178–208 km/h) Category 4 (130–156 mph, 209–251 km/h) Category 5 (≥157 mph, ≥252 km/h) Unknown Storm type Tropical cyclone Subtropical cyclone Extratropical cyclone, remnant low, tropical disturbance, or monsoon depression

Hurricane Dora's origins can be traced to a tropical wave that crossed over Central America into the Eastern Pacific on July 29, off the coast of El Salvador, producing a large area of rain and thunderstorms amid a favorable environment. The system became better organized on July 31, and Tropical Depression Five‑E developed that afternoon. Deep convection increased and the depression achieved tropical storm status by 09:00 UTC on August 1; the National Hurricane Center (NHC) assigned it the name Dora accordingly.

During August 2–3, Dora rapidly intensified to Category 4 strength, far to the southwest of Cabo San Lucas, Baja California Sur. Then, after undergoing an eyewall replacement cycle, and weakening to a Category 3, it re-intensified to Category 4, with sustained winds reaching 140 mph (220 km/h) early on August 4. Later that day and into the next, the system weakened to Category 2, before rebounding. Dora reached Category 4 for a third time on the afternoon of August 5, with sustained winds of 150 mph (240 km/h), displaying a symmetric 17-mile-wide (28 km) eye, surrounded by a thick ring of intense thunderstorm activity, wrapped within bands of showers and thunderstorms revolving around its core.

Dora remained a powerful Category 4 hurricane for the next several days, as it entered the Central Pacific basin on the morning of August 6, and passed far to the south of the Island of Hawaiʻi on August 8. Later, on the morning of August 9, Dora strengthened once again, generating winds of 145 mph (230 km/h) amid a low-shear, warm sea surface temperatures environment. It continued to display annular characteristics, with a well-defined, symmetrical 9.2-mile-wide (15 km) eye, surrounded by a compact central dense overcast of less than 120 miles (190 km) wide. Late that same day, Dora's annular structure deteriorated, leaving the system susceptible to dry air intrusions. During this time, the hurricane passed south of Johnston Island. As a result of the change in storm structure, Dora weakened to Category 3 strength on the morning of August 10. As the day progressed, southerly shear caused the hurricane's structure to begin to degrade some as it shifted its course toward the west-northwest along the southwest edge of a high pressure system.

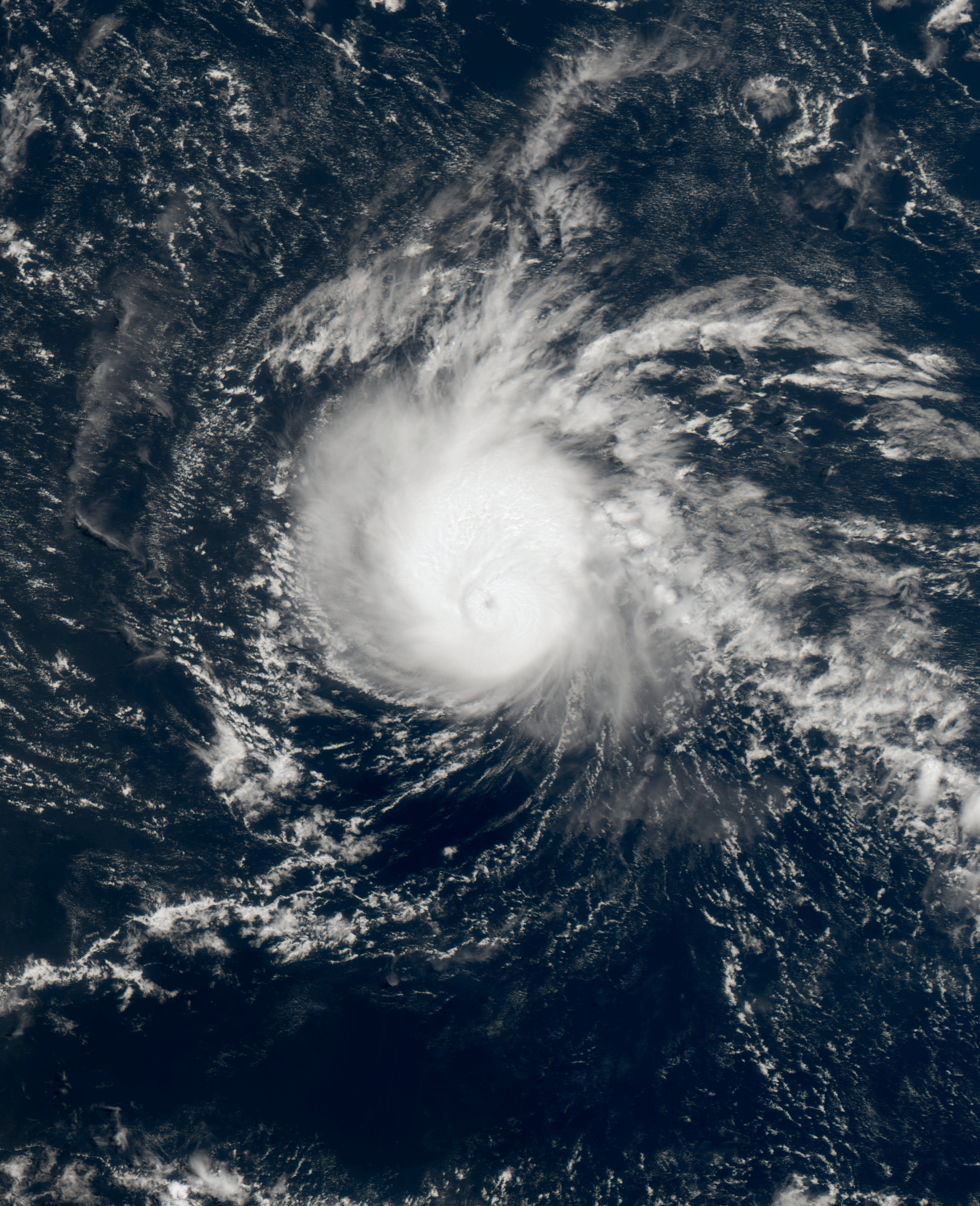
Typhoon Dora after entering the western Pacific Ocean on August 12

At 21:00 UTC on August 11, Dora weakened to Category 2 strength about 900 mi (1,450 km) south of Midway Island. The same day, Dora moved into the Western Pacific basin from the Central Pacific basin. At 00:00 UTC, August 12, the Japan Meteorological Agency (JMA) (Note: The Japan Meteorological Agency is the official Regional Specialized Meteorological Center for the western Pacific Ocean.) and the Joint Typhoon Warning Center (JTWC) (Note: The Joint Typhoon Warning Center is a joint United States Navy – United States Air Force task force that issues tropical cyclone warnings for the western Pacific Ocean and other regions.) initiated advisories on Dora, declaring that it had just crossed the International Date Line and classifying it as Typhoon Dora, becoming only the second tropical cyclone on record to be at hurricane strength in the Eastern, Central and Western Pacific basins, the other being Hurricane John in 1994. The cloud tops further warmed and its eye vanished from satellite imagery. Dora showed significant deterioration along the system's northern flank. Dora became increasingly sheared by early August 13, interacting with an upper-level trough. Vertical wind shear exceeded 35 km/h (25 mph). Further decay in the organization of the storm's deep convection caused Dora to be downgraded to a tropical storm.

With Dora's ragged center, the system remained disorganized, as wind shear was becoming displaced to the east. By the early hours of August 15, both agencies issued their final warnings on Dora; its LLCC further became broad and exposed. As Dora moved north under a mid-latitude upper low, it became strongly influenced by the low and started to exhibit subtropical characteristics, prompting the JTWC to reclassify the storm as subtropical cyclone at 15:00 UTC on August 18. At the same time, Dora was located within an environment of dry air, low vertical wind shear, and neutral 79–81 °F (26–27 °C) sea surface temperatures. However, the low-level circulation center had become displaced to the southeast. On early August 21 it fully transitioned to a extratropical system, according to the JMA. Both agencies continued tracking Dora until 06:00 UTC on August 22, as Dora exited the basin.

== Hawaii wildfires connection ==
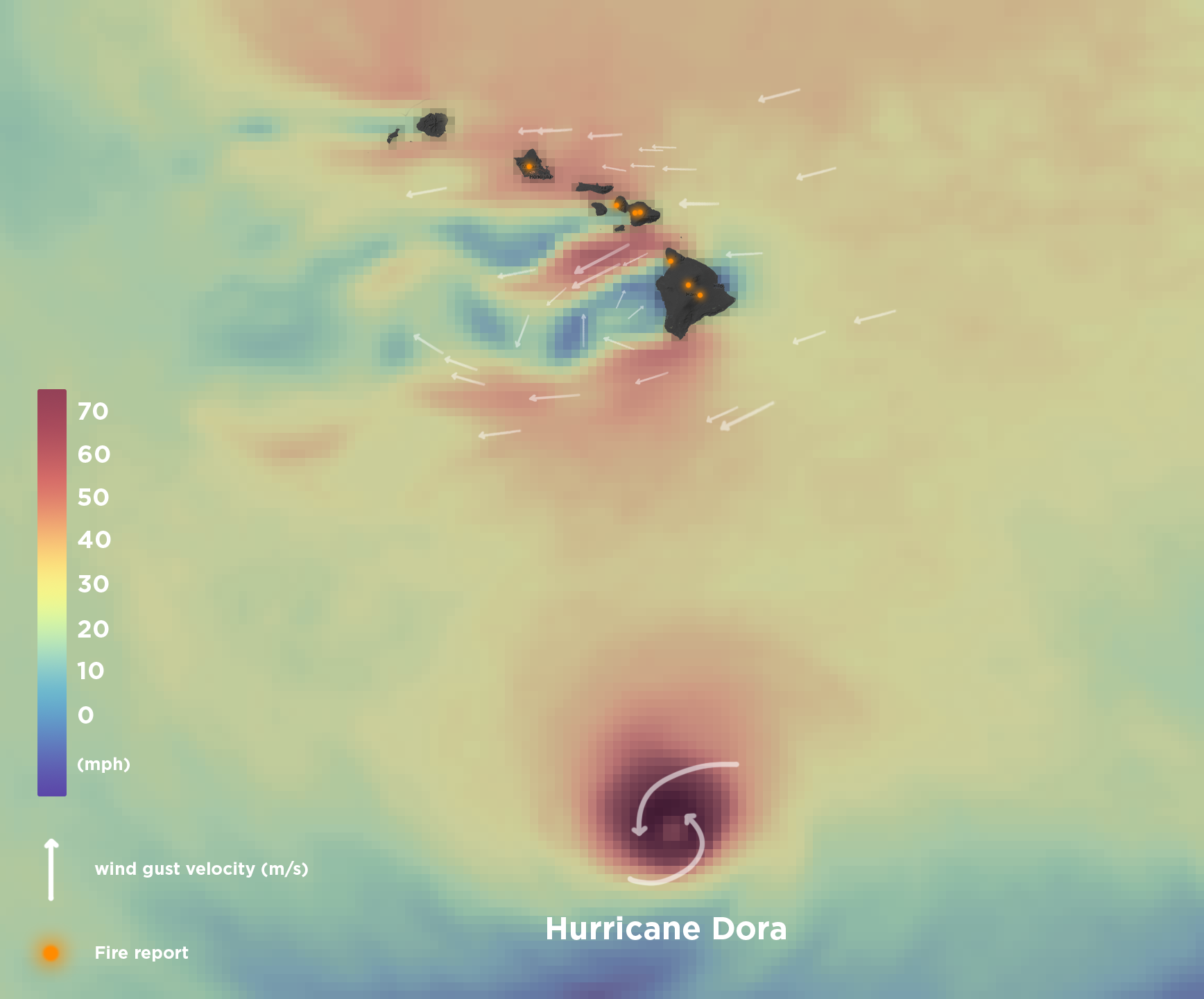
Wind speeds/gusts from Hurricane Dora near the Hawaiian Islands on August 8

While Hurricane Dora did not pose a direct threat to Hawaii, the National Weather Service in Honolulu did issue numerous weather warnings and advisories, especially red flag warnings, for portions of the various islands in expectation of the hurricane helping enhance trade winds in conjunction with an ongoing drought. A steep pressure gradient between a strong anticyclone to the north of Hawaii and Dora to the south produced incredibly strong gradient winds over the islands which in turn helped cause multiple wildfires in Hawaii. The most devastating fire broke out on Maui, where 102 people were killed. In addition, more than 2,200 buildings, primarily in Lahaina, were damaged or destroyed. The wildfires became the deadliest natural disaster in recorded Hawaii history.

The exact significance of Hurricane Dora and how it impacted the fires themselves remains somewhat unclear. Meteorologists noted that the storm's center remained more than 700 miles (1,100 km) from the islands and that it remained relatively small in size; however it also remained "remarkably potent for a long time", logging more hours as a Category 4 hurricane than any other storm in the Pacific for over 50 years. Philippe Papin, a hurricane specialist with the NHC, argued that Hurricane Dora played only a minor role in "enhancing low-level flow over Maui at fire initiation time." However, the NHC later noted that there were indications that Dora's passage south of Hawaii had some indications of tightening the pressure gradient and enhancing the low-level trade winds present in the islands.

== Retirement ==
On March 20, 2024, the name Dora was retired by the World Meteorological Organization on account of the hurricane's connection to the August 2023 wildfires in Hawaii and will never be used again in the Eastern Pacific basin. It will be replaced with Debora when the 2023 list of names is used again for the 2029 season.

== See also ==
- Other storms of the same name
- Timeline of the 2023 Pacific hurricane season
- Weather of 2023
- Tropical cyclones in 2023
- List of Category 4 Pacific hurricanes
- List of Hawaii hurricanes
- Hurricane Fico (1978) – another long-lived Category 4 hurricane that impacted Hawaii
- Hurricane John (1994) – the second longest-lived and furthest-traveling tropical cyclone ever recorded
- Hurricane Dora (1999) – a Category 4 hurricane that also crossed the International Date Line
- Hurricane Genevieve (2014) – another major hurricane that entered all three north Pacific tropical cyclone basins
- Hurricane Nolo (2026) – another long-lived tropical cyclone that also crossed the International Date Line.
