= Hurricane Lidia (2023) =

Category 4 Pacific hurricane

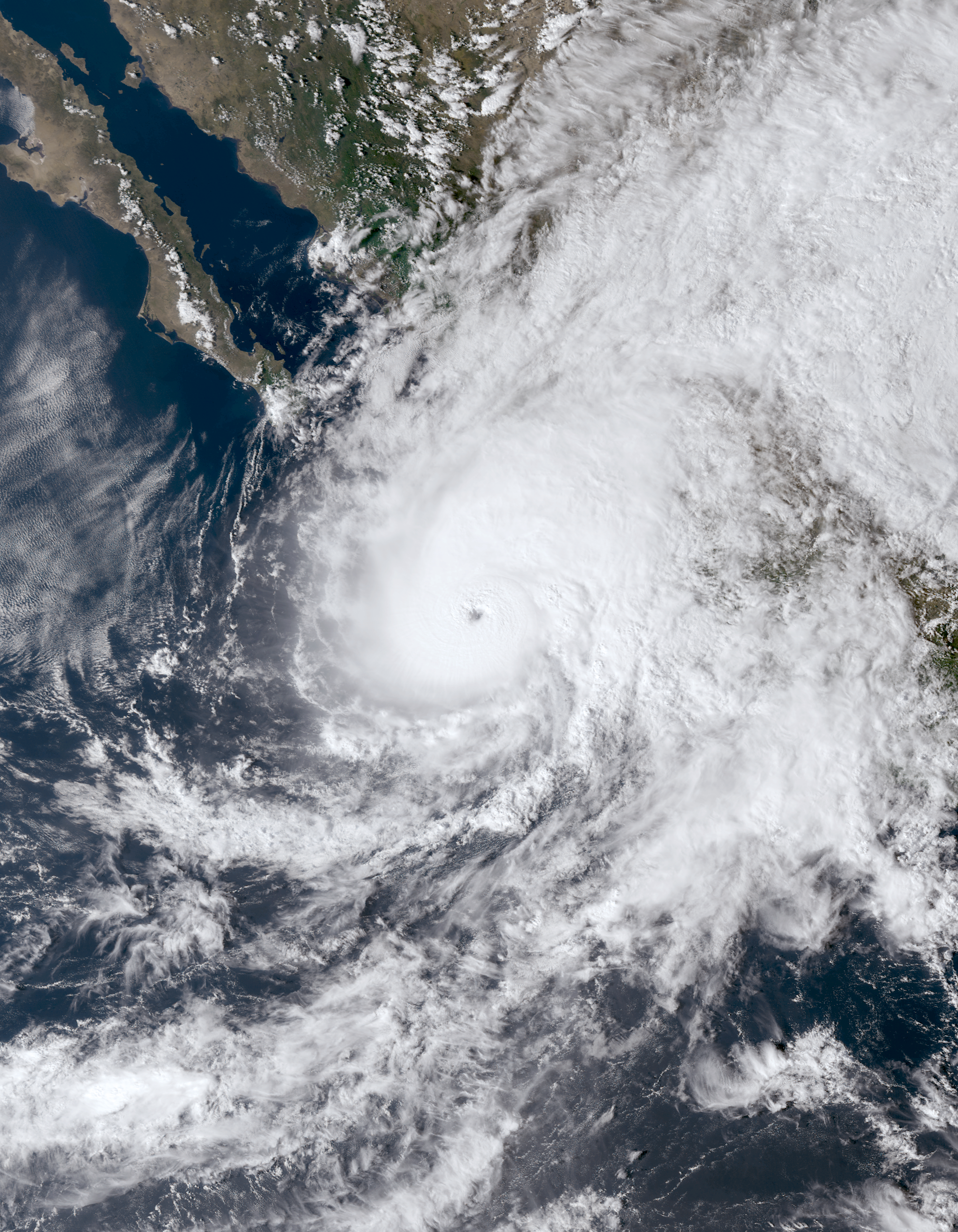
- Lidia at peak intensity just offshore Jalisco on October 10

Meteorological history
- Formed: October 3, 2023
- Dissipated: October 11, 2023

Category 4 major hurricane
- 1-minute sustained (SSHWS/NWS)
- Highest winds: 140 mph (220 km/h)
- Lowest pressure: 942 mbar (hPa); 27.82 inHg

Overall effects
- Fatalities: 3
- Damage: $79.2 million (2023 USD)
- Areas affected: Western Mexico, Islas Marías, Southwestern Mexico, Texas
- IBTrACS /
- Part of the 2023 Pacific hurricane season

Hurricane Lidia was a powerful Category 4 Pacific hurricane that was one of four tropical cyclones to make landfall on the Pacific Coast of Mexico in October 2023. The fifteenth tropical depression, twelfth named storm, eighth hurricane and sixth major hurricane (Note: A major hurricane is a hurricane that reaches Category 3 status or higher on the Saffir–Simpson scale) of the 2023 Pacific hurricane season, Lidia originated from a disturbance that developed to the south of Mexico in late September 2023. The disturbance developed into a tropical storm on October 3, and was given the name Lidia. Lidia initially meandered off the coast of Mexico for several days as a moderate tropical storm, while moving gradually northward. Lidia first turned northwestward before embarking on a northeastward course on October 9, at which time the storm began a phase of rapid intensification. Early on October 10, Lidia became a hurricane, and the storm continued to quickly intensify, reaching its peak intensity as a Category 4 hurricane late that day with sustained winds of 140 mph (220 km/h). Lidia made landfall shortly afterwards at peak intensity, making it the third-strongest landfalling Pacific hurricane on record at the time. Lidia rapidly weakened over the mountainous terrain of Mexico and dissipated the following morning over the inland state of Zacatecas.

Lidia caused extensive damage across southwestern Mexico, impacting the area less than 48 hours after it was struck by Tropical Storm Max. Lidia resulted in significant flooding, torrential rainfall and very powerful winds that severely damaged many structures, and the storm forced airport and school closings, along with the opening of 23 temporary shelters. Three deaths occurred due to Lidia in Mexico. Losses totaled to US$79.2 million.

== Meteorological history ==
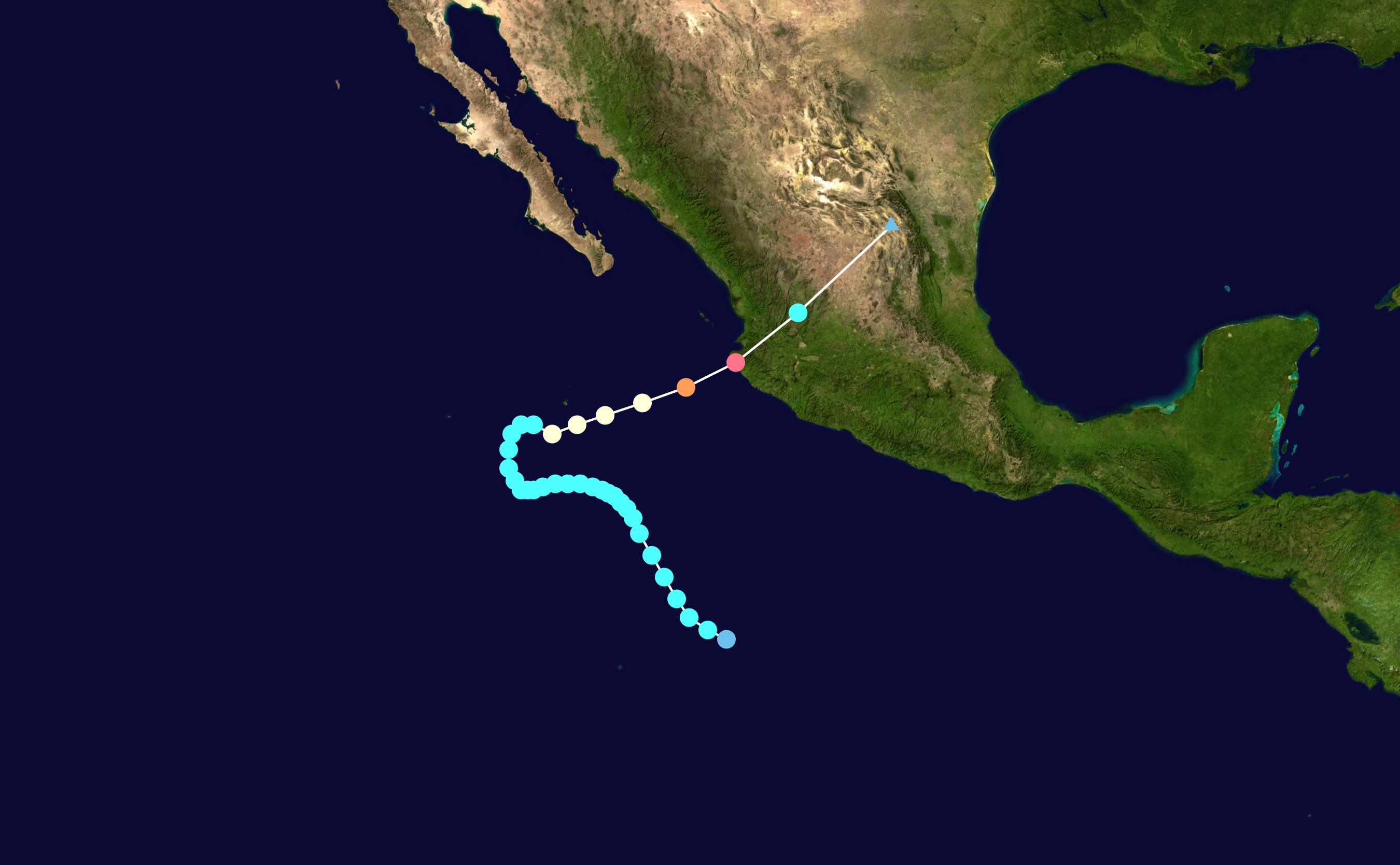
Map plotting the storm's track and intensity, according to the Saffir–Simpson scale Map key Saffir–Simpson scale Tropical depression (≤38 mph, ≤62 km/h) Tropical storm (39–73 mph, 63–118 km/h) Category 1 (74–95 mph, 119–153 km/h) Category 2 (96–110 mph, 154–177 km/h) Category 3 (111–129 mph, 178–208 km/h) Category 4 (130–156 mph, 209–251 km/h) Category 5 (≥157 mph, ≥252 km/h) Unknown Storm type Tropical cyclone Subtropical cyclone Extratropical cyclone, remnant low, tropical disturbance, or monsoon depression

As early as September 28, the National Hurricane Center (NHC) anticipated that a low pressure area would form south of Mexico, assessing a 20% chance of tropical cyclogenesis within seven days. Two days later, the NHC increased the potential for development to 70% – this was related to a tropical wave south of Mexico producing an area of thunderstorms, known as convection. On October 2, the convection became more concentrated, supported by favorable environmental conditions, and a low pressure area developed. At 09:00 UTC on October 3, the NHC initiated advisories on Tropical Storm Lidia, due to sufficient organization of the weather system. By that time, the thunderstorms had organized into curved rainbands, and the low pressure area had evolved into a well-defined circulation producing sustained winds of at least 40 mph (65 km/h).

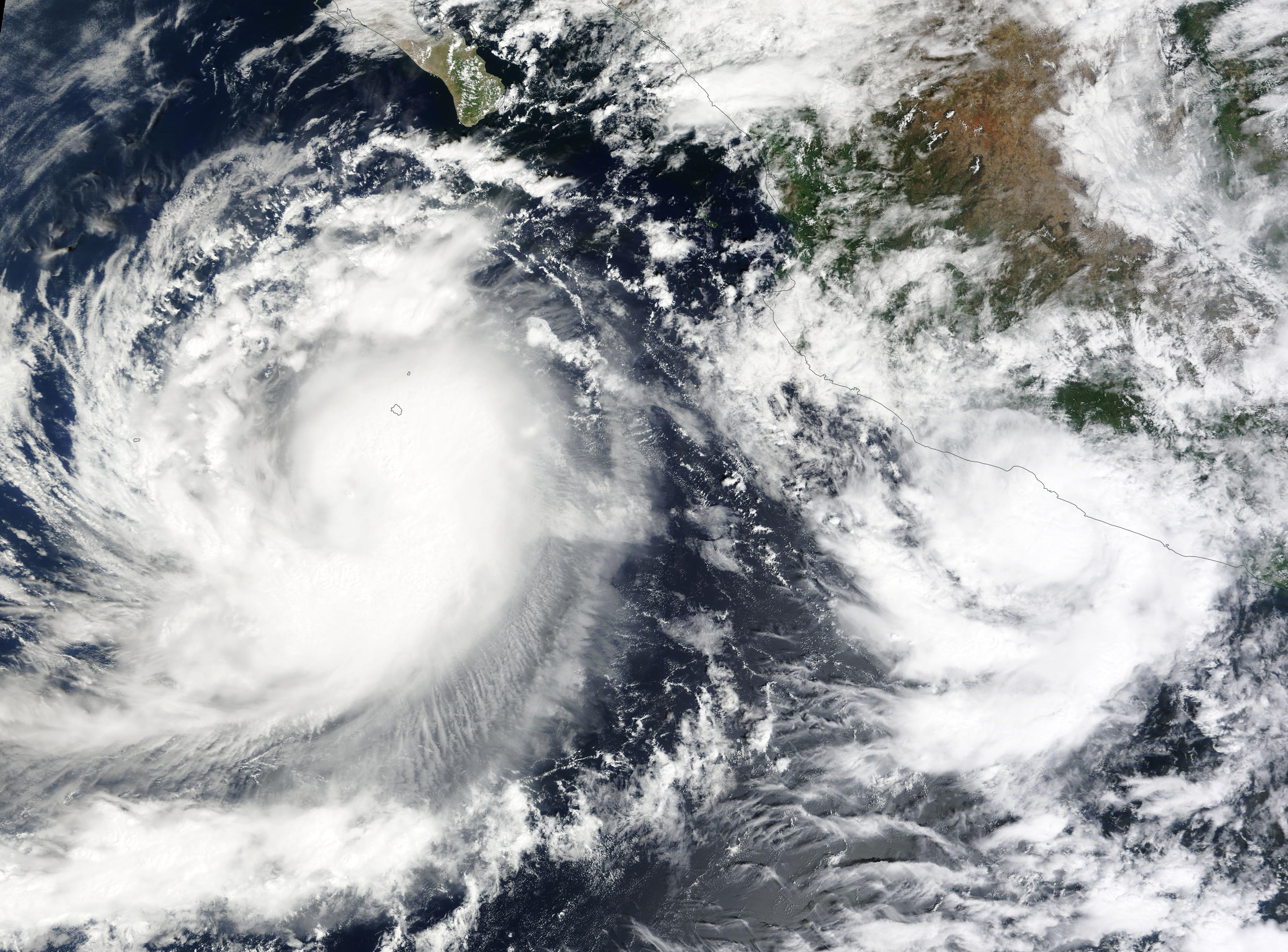
Lidia (left) strengthening, with Tropical Storm Max (right) nearing landfall, on October 9

Upon its formation, Lidia was expected to intensify to hurricane status within five days, due to sea surface temperatures of around 86 °F (30 °C) and ample moisture. However, the presence of easterly wind shear was an early deterring factor, which displaced the convection from the center. The thunderstorms continued to pulse over the center as Lidia moved north-northwestward, a path steered by a ridge over Mexico. Despite the wind shear, Lidia was able to continue to intensify. By October 6, the storm turned toward the west, as the circulation become more closely aligned with the deepest convection, a sign of a maturing tropical cyclone. Later that day, the wind shear nearly exposed the center from the thunderstorms, although the intensity had increased to just below hurricane-force, or winds of 74 mph (118 km/h). By that time, hurricane models had conflicting simulations for the future of Lidia. In the storm's immediate future, there was a consensus that a mid-latitude trough would steer the storm northward. Some computer models anticipated that the wind shear would remain strong enough to weaken the storm, while others predicted that it would intensify while moving toward the western coast of Mexico.

Satellite imagery of Lidia making landfall in western Mexico on October 11

On October 7, Lidia began its anticipated turn to the north. With the wind shear continuing to affect, there was still uncertainty in the storm's future. That day, the NHC forecast included a hurricane landfall in the Mexican state of Nayarit. By October 8, Lidia's structure had become more organized, with the center under the deepest convection, and a mid-level eye forming. The lower- and mid-level circulations were displaced, while the intrusion of drier air prevented more immediate intensification. On October 9, Lidia began its turn to the northeast, influenced by the approaching mid-level trough, which provided more favorable upper-level support. Concurrently, the convection increased over the center, signaling the start of an intensifying trend, which the NHC expected would continue up to the coast.

Late on October 9, the Hurricane Hunters flew into Lidia, observing a developing inner core of the cyclone, with a central barometric pressure of 985 mbar (29.1 inHg). Early on October 10, the storm intensified into a hurricane while located about 365 mi (590 km) southwest of Puerto Vallarta. As Lidia approached the Mexican coast, it developed an eyewall as it intensified into a Category 2 hurricane on the Saffir-Simpson scale. It then rapidly intensified to a Category 4 hurricane by 21:30 UTC on October 10, making landfall two hours later near Las Peñitas in the Mexican state of Jalisco, just south of Puerto Vallarta, at peak intensity, with winds of 140 mph (220 km/h). Once inland, Lidia rapidly weakened over the mountainous terrain of western Mexico. The eye quickly degraded and the convection diminished. By 09:00 UTC on October 11, the storm lost its well-defined center, less than ten hours after landfall. Lidia's remnants continued northeastward across northern Mexico, producing a large area of rainfall.

== Preparations and impact ==
Pacific hurricanes with a wind speed of 130 mph (215 km/h) or higher at landfall
Hurricane	Season	Wind speed	Ref.
Otis	2023	160 mph (260 km/h)	
Patricia	2015	150 mph (240 km/h)	
Madeline	1976	145 mph (230 km/h)	
Twelve	1957	140 mph (220 km/h)	
"Mexico"	1959	140 mph (220 km/h)	
Iniki	1992	140 mph (220 km/h)	
Kenna	2002	140 mph (220 km/h)	
Lidia	2023	140 mph (220 km/h)	

Lidia prompted the issuance of hurricane and tropical storm watches and warnings for western Mexico. Schools were closed across 23 municipalities in Mexico ahead of Lidia's anticipated landfall in the states of Sinaloa, Nayarit, and Jalisco, particularly in the latter state due to the combined threat of Lidia and the more southerly-tracking Tropical Storm Max, which made landfall in Guerrero less than two days prior. 23 storm shelters were opened in Jalisco alone. Several businesses in the resort town of Puerto Vallarta shut down and boarded up windows and doors and used sandbags as flood barriers. Licenciado Gustavo Díaz Ordaz International Airport was also closed on October 11 as Lidia approached the area, and 12 flights were cancelled. 6,000 Mexican armed forces members were deployed to Nayarit and Jalisco by Mexican President Andres Manuel Lopez Obrador to assist residents in vulnerable areas.

At the time of its landfall, Hurricane Lidia was the third-most intense Pacific hurricane on record to make landfall in Mexico. The cyclone produced intense rainfall and flash flooding as it moved onshore and inland over Jalisco. One person was killed in Punta Mita after strong winds from Lidia downed a tree on a van while another drowned in a swollen river. A third death occurred due to a bridge collapse in Villa de Álvarez, Colima. Numerous trees were uprooted, some of which blocked Federal Highway 200, and 136 people were placed in temporary storm shelters due to the hurricane. Several rivers and streams overflowed, which inundated houses and forced the closure of a hospital in Autlán de Navarro. Downed trees and power lines were reported across coastal Jalisco. Lidia significantly disrupted tourism along the coast, with several hotels, beaches and airports shutting down in response to the cyclone. Lidia's powerful winds uprooted nearly 960 trees across Puerto Vallarta; in response, a reforestation drive was initiated by the municipal government in November 2023. Several homes in the city had their roofs blown completely off by Lidia's powerful winds, and two people were seriously injured during the storm. Preliminary rainfall totals reached 5.3 in (130 mm) in the neighboring state of Colima, with 5.1 in (130 mm) falling in the city of Manzanillo. Damage in Colima totaled to Mex$6.2 million (US$337,000). Damage in Nayarit totaled to Mex$900,000 (US$49,000).

Jalisco's governor, Enrique Alfaro, estimated that Lidia caused losses worth 1.4 billion pesos (US$78.8 million) in the state. Alfaro appealed to the Mexican federal government for financial support in recovery efforts from the cyclone. The combined remnant moisture of Lidia and Max combined with a frontal boundary over the Gulf of Mexico and contributed to beneficial rainfall along the Gulf Coast of the United States, which was suffering from drought conditions. Moisture from Lidia's remnants also sent moderate rainfall into southern Texas.

== See also ==
- Weather of 2023
- Tropical cyclones in 2023
- Timeline of the 2023 Pacific hurricane season
- List of Category 4 Pacific hurricanes
- Other tropical cyclones named Lidia
- Hurricane Madeline (1976)
- Hurricane Lane (2006)
- Hurricane Patricia (2015)
- Hurricane Willa (2018)
- Hurricane Otis (2023)
