= Las Vigas =

Municipality in the Mexican state of Guerrero

- Municipality
- Location of Las Vigas Las Vigas (Mexico)
- Coordinates: 16°45′44″N 99°13′44″W
- Country: Mexico
- State: Guerrero
- Incorporated: 21 May 2022
- Seat: Las Vigas

Area
  - Total: 147.54 km^{2} (56.97 sq mi)

Population (2020 Census)
  - Total: 9,449
  - Density: 64.04/km^{2} (165.9/sq mi)
  - Seat: 4,762
- Time zone: UTC-6 (Central)
- Postal codes: 39990–39997
- Area code: 745

Las Vigas is a municipality in the Mexican state of Guerrero. It is located about 95 kilometres (59 mi) southeast of the state capital of Chilpancingo. Its creation from the municipality of San Marcos was approved in 2021 and went into force on 21 May 2022.

== Geography ==
The municipality of Las Vigas is located in the Costa Chica region of eastern Guerrero. It borders the municipalities of San Marcos to the west, Tecoanapa to the north, Florencio Villarreal to the east, and the Pacific Ocean to the south. Most of the municipality lies within the drainage basin of Tecomate Lagoon, which extends into the southwestern part of the municipality, and is part of the Lagunas Costeras de Guerrero Key Biodiversity Area. The northeastern part of the municipality lies in the basin of the Nexpa River, which forms part of the border between Las Vigas and Florencio Villarreal.

Las Vigas has a subhumid temperate climate with rain in the summer. Average temperatures range between 26 and 28 °C (79–82 °F).

Climate data for Las Vigas weather station at 16°45′03″N 99°14′05″W, 60 m above sea level (1981–2010 averages, 1951–2010 extremes)
Month	Jan	Feb	Mar	Apr	May	Jun	Jul	Aug	Sep	Oct	Nov	Dec	Year
Record high °C (°F)	38.0 (100.4)	38.5 (101.3)	39.5 (103.1)	40.0 (104.0)	41.0 (105.8)	40.0 (104.0)	40.0 (104.0)	39.5 (103.1)	38.0 (100.4)	38.5 (101.3)	39.0 (102.2)	38.5 (101.3)	41.0 (105.8)
Mean daily maximum °C (°F)	32.5 (90.5)	32.7 (90.9)	33.1 (91.6)	33.8 (92.8)	34.0 (93.2)	32.9 (91.2)	32.5 (90.5)	32.4 (90.3)	31.8 (89.2)	32.4 (90.3)	33.0 (91.4)	32.8 (91.0)	32.8 (91.0)
Daily mean °C (°F)	25.0 (77.0)	25.0 (77.0)	25.5 (77.9)	26.5 (79.7)	27.8 (82.0)	27.7 (81.9)	27.4 (81.3)	27.3 (81.1)	26.9 (80.4)	27.0 (80.6)	26.4 (79.5)	25.6 (78.1)	26.5 (79.7)
Mean daily minimum °C (°F)	17.4 (63.3)	17.3 (63.1)	17.9 (64.2)	19.2 (66.6)	21.5 (70.7)	22.5 (72.5)	22.2 (72.0)	22.2 (72.0)	21.9 (71.4)	21.6 (70.9)	19.8 (67.6)	18.4 (65.1)	20.2 (68.4)
Record low °C (°F)	12.5 (54.5)	10.0 (50.0)	11.0 (51.8)	13.0 (55.4)	14.0 (57.2)	18.5 (65.3)	19.0 (66.2)	19.0 (66.2)	19.0 (66.2)	17.0 (62.6)	13.0 (55.4)	12.0 (53.6)	10.0 (50.0)
Average precipitation mm (inches)	14.4 (0.57)	8.6 (0.34)	1.5 (0.06)	0.6 (0.02)	43.7 (1.72)	292.4 (11.51)	244.9 (9.64)	246.6 (9.71)	312.3 (12.30)	125.9 (4.96)	9.4 (0.37)	9.7 (0.38)	1,310 (51.57)
Average rainy days (≥ 0.1 mm)	0.8	0.4	0.1	0.2	3.0	12.6	13.5	14.3	16.0	7.2	1.3	0.6	70.0
Source: Servicio Meteorológico Nacional

== History ==
Las Vigas and its surrounding communities had been demanding the creation of an independent municipal government since at least 2014. On 31 August 2021, the Guerrero state congress approved the formation of the municipality of Las Vigas from nineteen localities previously belonging to San Marcos. The state constitutional amendment establishing the municipality was passed on 13 January 2022 and went into force on 21 May 2022.

== Administration ==
Las Vigas will hold its first elections as an independent municipality in 2024. The municipal government of Las Vigas will consist of a municipal president, a councillor (Spanish: síndico), and six trustees (regidores).

== Demographics ==
In the 2020 INEGI census, the localities that now comprise the municipality of Las Vigas recorded a population of 9449 inhabitants. The municipal seat, also named Las Vigas, recorded a population of 4762 inhabitants in the 2020 Census.

== Economy and infrastructure ==
The flat land of Las Vigas is well suited for farming and animal husbandry. The municipality is irrigated by the Nexpa River and the Revolución Mexicana reservoir on that river. Fishing and artisanal salt production are practised in Tecomate Lagoon.

Mexican Federal Highway 200 runs through the municipal seat, connecting it with San Marcos and Acapulco to the west, and Cruz Grande and Ometepec to the east.

Secondary education is available in Las Vigas, including a preparatory school for the Autonomous University of Guerrero.
