= Hurricane Max (2017) =

Category 1 Pacific hurricane in 2017

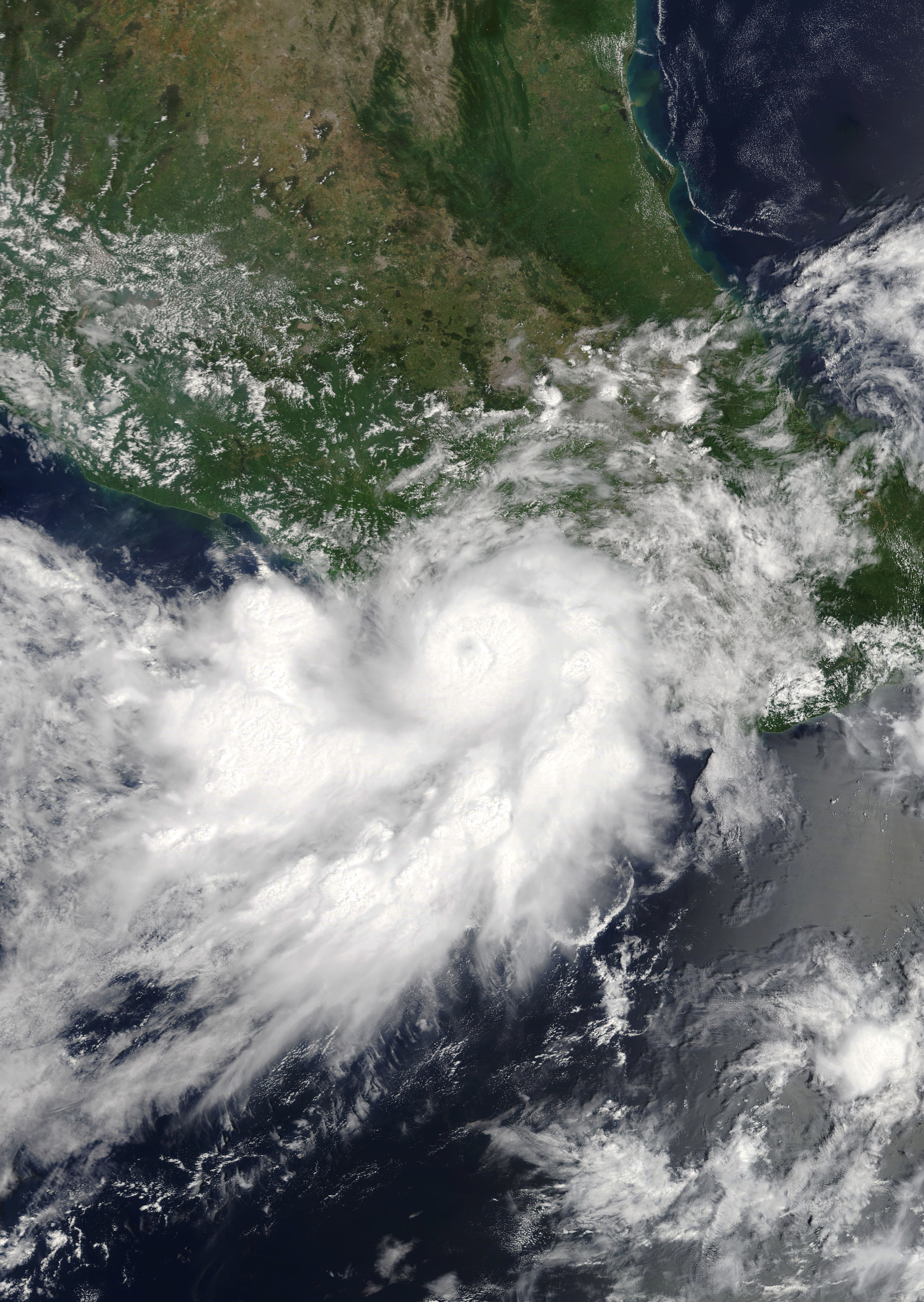
- Max near peak intensity shortly before landfall in Guerrero on September 14

Meteorological history
- Formed: September 13, 2017
- Dissipated: September 15, 2017

Category 1 hurricane
- 1-minute sustained (SSHWS/NWS)
- Highest winds: 90 mph (150 km/h)
- Lowest pressure: 980 mbar (hPa); 28.94 inHg

Overall effects
- Fatalities: 4 total
- Damage: $76.4 million
- Areas affected: Mexico, Arizona, California
- IBTrACS /
- Part of the 2017 Pacific hurricane season

Hurricane Max was a rapidly-forming tropical cyclone that made landfall in southwestern Mexico, causing minor damage. The sixteenth tropical cyclone, thirteenth named storm, and seventh hurricane of the 2017 Pacific hurricane season, Max developed from a trough of low pressure near the southwestern coast of Mexico on September 13. The storm tracked northeastward under the influence of a mid-level ridge and rapidly strengthened as a result of warm ocean temperatures in its path. Max strengthened into a hurricane on September 14 and peaked as a high-end Category 1 hurricane on the Saffir–Simpson scale shortly before making landfall in the Mexican state of Guerrero. Rapid weakening ensued as Max moved over the mountainous terrain of Mexico, and it weakened below hurricane strength early on September 15. At 12:00 UTC that day, Max dissipated over the mountains of southern Mexico.

The Government of Mexico issued numerous tropical storm and hurricane watches and warnings in anticipation of Max's arrival. Due to the small size of the cyclone, effects were relatively localized and confined to a small area. Regardless, large waves, flooding, mudslides, and sinkholes caused by Max caused moderate damage in the state of Guerrero. Over 1,500 residences suffered flood damage, and numerous roads across the state, including Mexican Federal Highway 200, were closed due to landslides and sinkholes. The storm exacerbated the effects of the 2017 Chiapas earthquake, which killed 98 people. Four deaths were associated with Max: two in Guerrero and two in Chiapas. Damage from the storm and another earthquake that followed shortly was estimated at MX$1.35 billion (US$76.4 million). It was also the first hurricane-strength tropical cyclone to make direct landfall in Guerrero since Hurricane Boris in 1996.

== Meteorological history ==
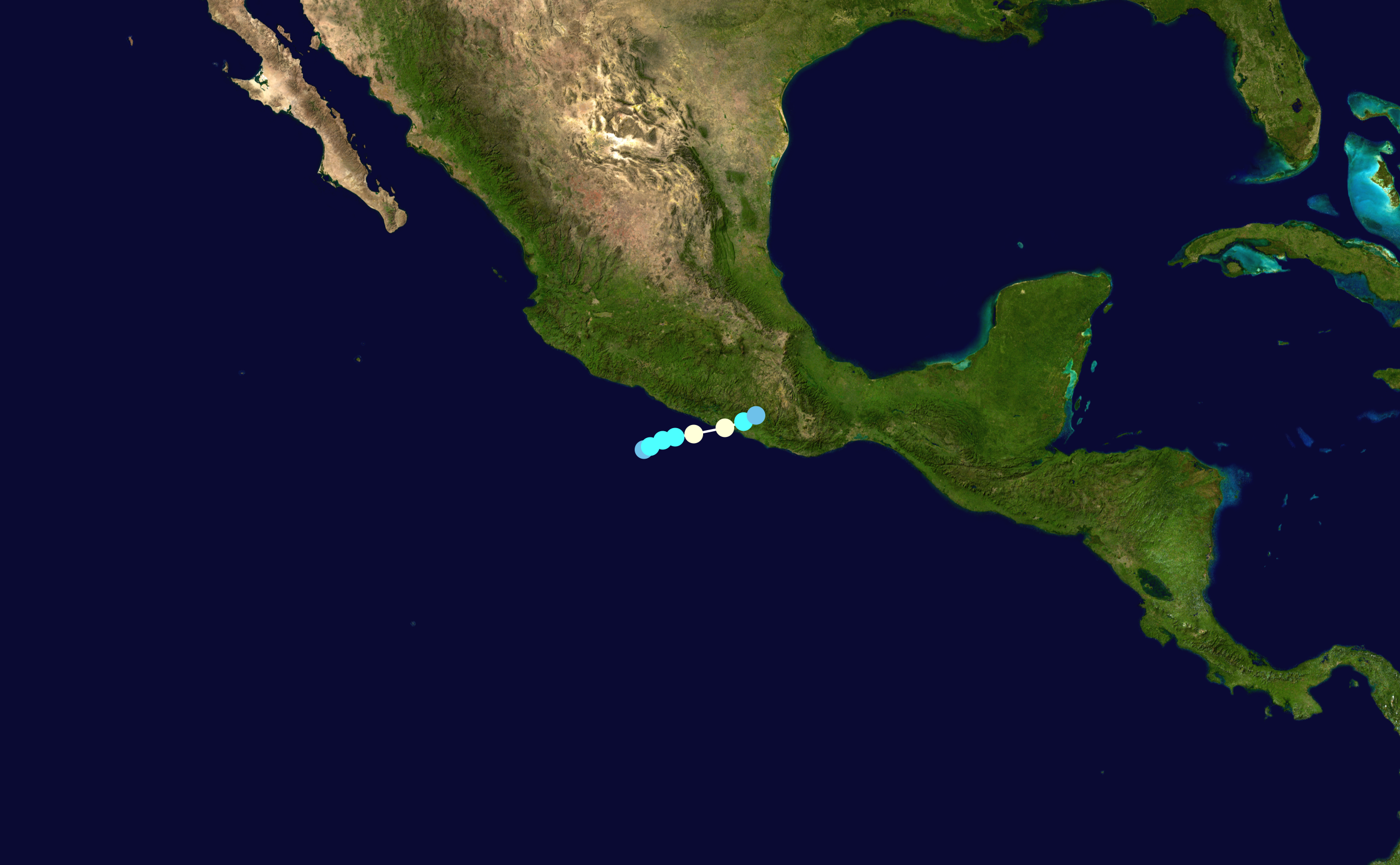
Map plotting the storm's track and intensity, according to the Saffir–Simpson scale Map key Saffir–Simpson scale Tropical depression (≤38 mph, ≤62 km/h) Tropical storm (39–73 mph, 63–118 km/h) Category 1 (74–95 mph, 119–153 km/h) Category 2 (96–110 mph, 154–177 km/h) Category 3 (111–129 mph, 178–208 km/h) Category 4 (130–156 mph, 209–251 km/h) Category 5 (≥157 mph, ≥252 km/h) Unknown Storm type Tropical cyclone Subtropical cyclone Extratropical cyclone, remnant low, tropical disturbance, or monsoon depression

A tropical wave – the same that spawned Hurricane Jose in the Atlantic – crossed Central America and entered the Pacific Ocean on September 11. Vorticity associated with the wave soon became intertwined within a broad cyclonic gyre in the lower levels of the atmosphere. On September 13, a large area of convection, or thunderstorms, associated with this system began to organize a few hundred miles southwest of the coast of Mexico. Satellite imagery indicated that a well-defined center of circulation had formed, and at 12:00 UTC that day, the disturbance was upgraded to a tropical depression while located 150 mi (240 km) west-southwest of Acapulco, Mexico. Initially, the depression was not forecast to intensify, due to a portion of the circulation already interacting with land. Six hours later, the depression strengthened into a tropical storm, receiving the name Max, while being steered east-northeastward by a mid-level ridge. The cloud pattern of the cyclone continued to consolidate, with a well-defined curved rain band wrapping around the center. Located over water temperatures as warm as 30 °C (86 °F), and under a divergent upper-level environment, Max underwent a period of rapid intensification.

A microwave pass on the afternoon of September 13 revealed that Max developed a mid-level eye, signifying that the storm had formed an inner core. Radar from Acapulco showed that the structure of the storm continued to improve, with a well-defined eye surrounded by a closed eyewall. Based on these signals, it was estimated that Max strengthened into a hurricane just before 12:00 UTC on September 14. Around this time, Max's forward direction turned to the east, moving right offshore the shoreline of Mexico. Max continued to strengthen throughout the day, with an eye becoming distinct for a few hours on both visible and infrared satellite imagery. Max reached its peak intensity with maximum sustained winds of 90 mph (140 km/h) shortly before making landfall in Guerrero, Mexico at 18:00 UTC on September 14. The eye subsequently disappeared, and the radar and satellite presentations deteriorated significantly while moving inland. Located over the mountainous terrain of Mexico, Max rapidly weakened to a tropical depression at 06:00 UTC on September 15. The circulation of Max completely dissipated at 12:00 UTC.

== Preparations ==
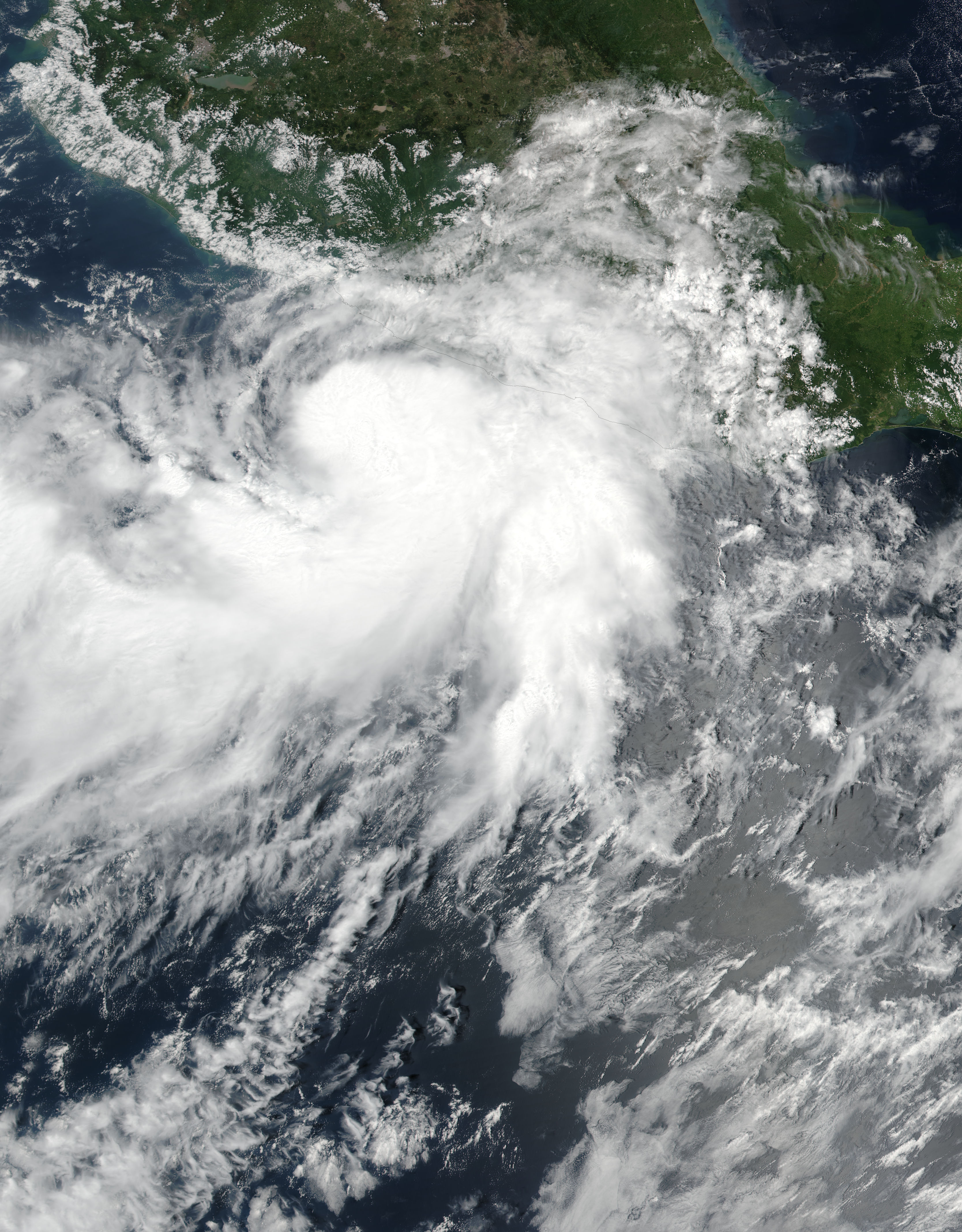
Tropical Storm Max intensifying off the southwest coast of Mexico

Upon the classification of Max as a tropical depression, the Government of Mexico issued a tropical storm watch for the southwest coast from Zihuatanejo to Punta Maldonado. At 21:00 UTC, the watch was replaced with a tropical storm warning as Max strengthened into a tropical storm. Six hours later, the Government of Mexico issued a hurricane watch for the same areas to accompany the tropical storm warning as Max continued to intensify. The hurricane watch and tropical storm warning were replaced by a hurricane warning at 12:00 UTC on September 14 as Max strengthened into a hurricane. Three hours later, a tropical storm warning and a hurricane watch were issued for areas east of Punta Maldonado to Lagunas de Chacahua. On September 15, all watches and warnings were discontinued as Max rapidly weakened and moved inland. In post-analysis, the NHC reflected that due to the agency's intensity forecasts failed to capture Max's rapid intensification, resulting in a Hurricane Warning and Hurricane Watch being issued only 9 hours and 15 hours, respectively, before landfall.

In preparation for the storm's arrival, 788 people were evacuated to temporary storm shelters. Classes in more than 1,200 schools were canceled in Guerrero. Authorities worked hurriedly to widen a channel to the Pacific Ocean to curb a coastal lagoon from flooding. Boaters and fishermen in Acapulco took their boats out of the water. The Civil Protection of Guerrero initiated a Red Alert. The Federal Electricity Commission activated an emergency plan that deployed 462 workers, 201 vehicles, and other materials to respond to the hurricane's aftermath.

== Impact and aftermath ==
Torrential rainfall produced by Max caused flooding and mudslides across the entire state of Guerrero, damaging over 1,500 homes within the state. In the township of San Marcos, 200 homes were damaged by strong winds and flooding, and one person was reported to have disappeared. Two people were killed in Guerrero: a 19-year-old fisherman who was swept into the Balsas River and a 40-year-old man who was carried away by floodwaters. Strong winds downed hundreds of trees while sinkholes and mudslides caused many roads to close – including Mexican Federal Highway 200 – which caused travel disruptions across Guerrero and Oaxaca and left numerous travelers stranded. During the storm, telephone service across southwestern Mexico was cut, and 126,503 Comisión Federal de Electricidad customers lost electricity. Access to the town of Juchitán de Zaragoza was severed due to flooded roadways, and a bridge between Cruz Grande and Copala was severely damaged. Across Guerrero, Max hampered communication, destroyed farmland, and left at least 3,000 residents displaced. Offshore and on the coast of Mexico, waves as high as 16 feet (4.9 meters) caused six fishing vessels to sink. In Chiapas, two people were buried in a landslide. Total damages from Max and the earthquake on September 19 are estimated at MX$1.35 billion (US$76.4 million).

The Drinking Water, Sewerage, and Sanitation Commission of the State of Guerrero and Conagua restored 21 drinking water systems. Nonstop work was done to install a pipeline that crossed the Tecoaloya and La Estancia rivers. Governor of Guerrero Héctor Astudillo Flores toured Costa Chica on September 15. Astudillo Flores requested an emergency declaration from the federal government for the municipalities of Petatlán, San Marcos, and Cruz Grande. He pledged support to residents in Costa Chica through the Temporary Employment Program and other services. An earthquake on September 19 exacerbated impacts caused by Max in Guerrero. On September 25, the Secretary of Education in Guerrero, José Luis González de la Vega Otero, allowed the resumption of schools in the state. However, 100 schools in 22 municipalities were kept suspended due to damage; the directors of those schools were notified of relocation to resume classes.

== See also ==
- Weather of 2017
- Tropical cyclones in 2017
- Other tropical cyclones named Max
- List of Category 1 Pacific hurricanes
- Hurricane Boris (1996) - Hurricane of nearly identical intensity that affected similar areas.
- Hurricane Cosme (1989) - Similar, but much larger storm.
- Hurricane Carlotta (2012) - Made landfall in nearby Oaxaca.
- Hurricane Agatha (2022)
