= San Marcos Municipality =

San Marcos Municipality may refer to:

- San Marcos, Sucre, Colombia
- San Marcos, El Salvador
- San Marcos, Guatemala
- San Marcos Municipality, Jalisco, Mexico
- San Marcos Municipality, Guerrero, Mexico
