= Potential tropical cyclone =

US designation of tropical weather

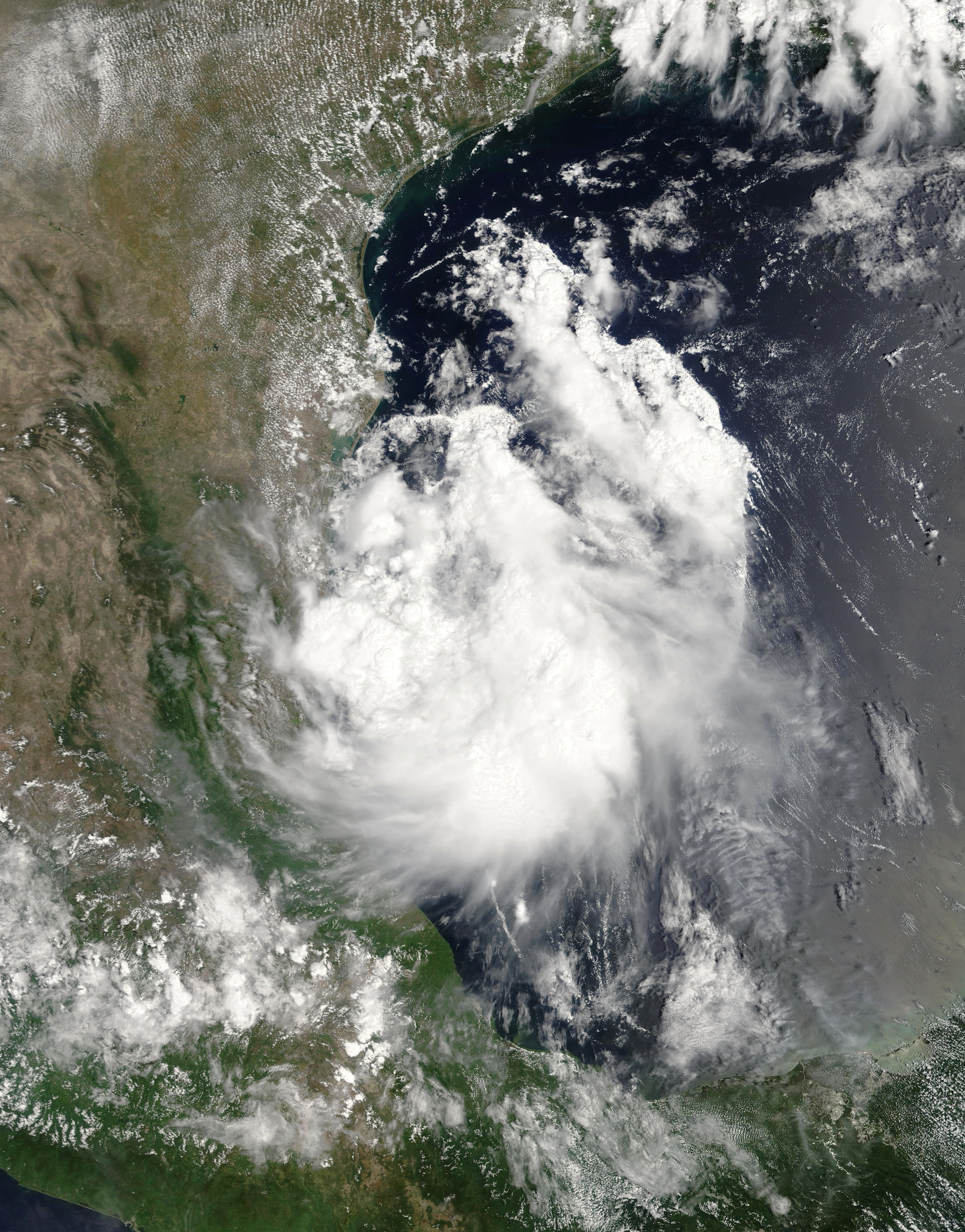
Example of a potential tropical cyclone during the 2022 Atlantic hurricane season

Potential tropical cyclone is a designation used by the National Hurricane Center (NHC) in the Atlantic and Northeast Pacific basins that enables for features of high likelihood of undergoing tropical cyclogenesis to have watches and warnings issued for them. The practice began in 2017.

== Operationality ==
The NHC defines a potential tropical cyclone as a disturbance which is not a tropical cyclone but is threatening to cause tropical storm or hurricane conditions to a landmass within 72 hours.

Advisories related to potential tropical cyclones are the same as developed tropical cyclones. The advent of the designation allowed for issuance of tropical cyclone warnings and watches prior to the development of a tropical cyclone. Prior, those watches and warnings could only be issued for fully-formed tropical cyclones.

== History ==
The term was introduced for the 2017 Atlantic hurricane season with the aim of giving citizens more time to prepare for systems. At this point, disturbances were designated as such with a head time of 48 hours. The first system to be designated as a potential tropical cyclone was Tropical Storm Bret as it was moving towards the Windward Islands.

In 2025, the leading time for designation was extended to 72 hours before expected impact.

=== Usage ===
System	Date designated (Note: Different from formation date)	Area threatened (Note: This only includes locations that the system was threatening upon designation as a PTC and not places throughout the entire lifespan of the system.)	Peak classification (SSHWS)	References
Tropical Storm Bret	June 18, 2017	Windward Islands	Tropical storm	
Tropical Storm Cindy	June 19, 2017	Louisiana	Tropical storm	
Hurricane Harvey	August 17, 2017	Lesser Antilles	Category 4	
Tropical Storm Lidia	August 26, 2017	Baja California Sur	Tropical storm	
Potential Tropical Cyclone Ten	August 27, 2017	Carolinas	Potential tropical cyclone	
Tropical Storm Philippe	October 27, 2017	Cuba, The Bahamas	Tropical storm	
Hurricane Florence	August 30, 2018	Cape Verde	Category 4	
Hurricane Helene	September 7, 2018	Cape Verde	Category 2	
Hurricane Humberto	September 12, 2019	The Bahamas	Category 3	
Potential Tropical Cyclone Seventeen-E	October 16, 2019	South Mexico	Potential tropical cyclone	
Hurricane Isaias	July 28, 2020	Antilles	Category 1	
Tropical Storm Fred	August 9, 2021	Antilles	Tropical storm	
Hurricane Grace	August 13, 2021	Leeward Islands	Category 3	
Tropical Storm Alex	June 2, 2022	Cuba, Florida	Tropical storm	
Hurricane Bonnie	June 27, 2022	Windward Islands	Category 3	
Potential Tropical Cyclone Four	August 19, 2022	Tamaulipas, Texas	Potential tropical cyclone	
Hurricane Julia	October 6, 2022	Colombia	Category 1	
Hurricane Lisa	October 30, 2022	Jamaica, Grand Cayman	Category 1	
Tropical Storm Max	October 7, 2023	South Mexico	Tropical storm	
Potential Tropical Cyclone Twenty-Two	November 16, 2023	Greater Antilles, Lucayan Archipelago	Potential tropical cyclone	
Hurricane Francine	September 8, 2024	Gulf of Mexico	Category 2	
Potential Tropical Cyclone Eight	September 15, 2024	Carolinas	Potential tropical cyclone	
Hurricane Helene	September 23, 2024	Yucatán Peninsula, Cuba	Category 4	
Tropical Storm Nadine	October 18, 2024	Yucatán Peninsula	Tropical storm	
Hurricane Erick	June 16, 2025	South Mexico	Category 4	
Hurricane Imelda	September 26, 2025	The Bahamas	Category 1	
Tropical Storm Arthur	June 16, 2026	Texas, Louisiana	Tropical storm	
Hurricane Lala	August 12, 2026	Hawaii (Note: Neither watches nor warnings issued initially)	Category 4	
Tropical Storm Edouard	August 31, 2026	Texas, Louisiana	Tropical storm	

== See also ==
- Glossary of tropical cyclone terms
- Invest (meteorology)
- Post-tropical cyclone
- Tropical wave
