= List of storms named Mac =

List of storms with the same or similar names

The name Mac has been used for four tropical cyclones, all in the Western Pacific Ocean:

- Severe Tropical Storm Mac (1979) (T7914, 27W, Pepang) – crossed southern Luzon and then made landfall near Hong Kong
- Typhoon Mac (1982) (T8221, 28W, Uding) – an intense Category 5-equivalent typhoon that stayed at sea throughout its existence
- Tropical Storm Mac (1986) (T8604, 04W, Klaring) – an early-season storm that brushed the coasts of Taiwan and northern Luzon
- Typhoon Mac (1989) (T8913, 15W) – a moderately strong typhoon which struck Japan

== See also ==
- List of storms named Max, a similar name used for tropical cyclones in the Eastern Pacific and Australian region basins
