= Potential Tropical Cyclone Seventeen-E =

Pacific potential tropical cyclone in 2019

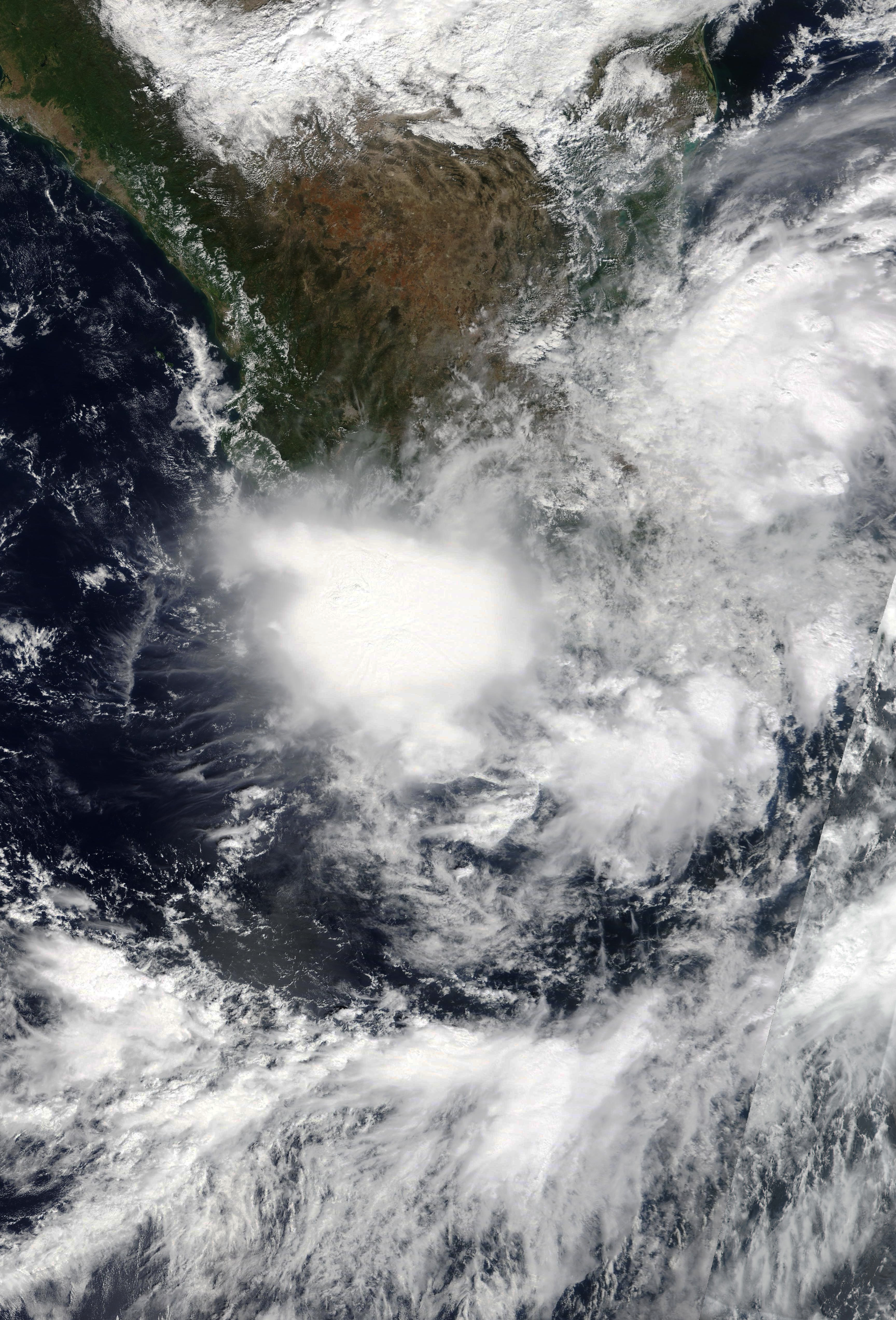
- Potential Tropical Cyclone Seventeen-E off the coast of Oaxaca on October 16

Meteorological history
- Formed: October 16, 2019
- Dissipated: October 16, 2019

Potential tropical cyclone
- 1-minute sustained (SSHWS/NWS)
- Highest winds: 35 mph (55 km/h)
- Lowest pressure: 1005 mbar (hPa); 29.68 inHg

Overall effects
- Fatalities: 7
- Areas affected: Southern Mexico (especially Oaxaca), Guatemala, El Salvador
- Part of the 2019 Pacific hurricane season (unofficially)

Potential Tropical Cyclone Seventeen-E was a tropical disturbance that caused damaging floods in Southern Mexico, Guatemala, and El Salvador in mid-October 2019. A tropical wave entered the Eastern Pacific Ocean during October 13–14, and a low-pressure area developed by October 14 to the west of Nicaragua. Convection, also known as thunderstorm activity, associated with the system increased in both intensity and extent during October 15, while the system was south of Guatemala. The National Hurricane Center initiated advisories on the system as Potential Tropical Cyclone Seventeen-E on October 16, anticipating that the system would become a tropical cyclone before reaching the southern coast of Mexico. During its existence as a potential tropical cyclone, Seventeen-E had winds of 35 mph (55 km/h) and a pressure of 1,005 mbar (29.68 inHg). As the storm tracked northwestward towards the coast, its structure decayed, and the chance of tropical cyclogenesis decreased markedly. The disturbance made landfall between Bahias de Huatulco and Salina Cruz, Oaxaca, during mid-day October 16 and dissipated a few hours later.

A tropical storm watch was issued for the southern coast of Mexico on October 16. Torrential rainfall occurred throughout the Isthmus of Tehuantepec, Guatemala, and El Salvador. The highest rainfall occurred in the state of Oaxaca, where 445 mm (17.5 in) was recorded. There, rainfall flooded and damaged roads and caused rivers to spill their banks; hundreds of homes and other structures were inundated by floodwaters. Several communities were left isolated as a result of rivers flooding roads and bridges. A river also overflowed in Ometepec, Guerrero, sending floodwaters into Talapa. Plan DN-III-E, a disaster relief and rescue plan, was activated in Oaxaca, Guerrero, and Tabasco states. Troops from the Mexican Army were called in to assist with cleanup and rescue efforts in Oaxaca. The storm left a total of 7 people dead in Central America; 6 people were killed in El Salvador and 1 in Guatemala. Nearly 2,000 people were forced to evacuate in El Salvador. There, over 100 homes were inundated and more than 100 schools were damaged. Over 100 landslides occurred and nearly 5 dozen trees fell, damaging roads and homes. Around 10 percent of the country's seasonal bean crop was destroyed. In Guatemala, the streets of several towns were flooded, and landslides and felled trees blocked roads and damaged structures. The Guatemalan government readied emergency supplies for those affected by the storm.

== Meteorological history ==
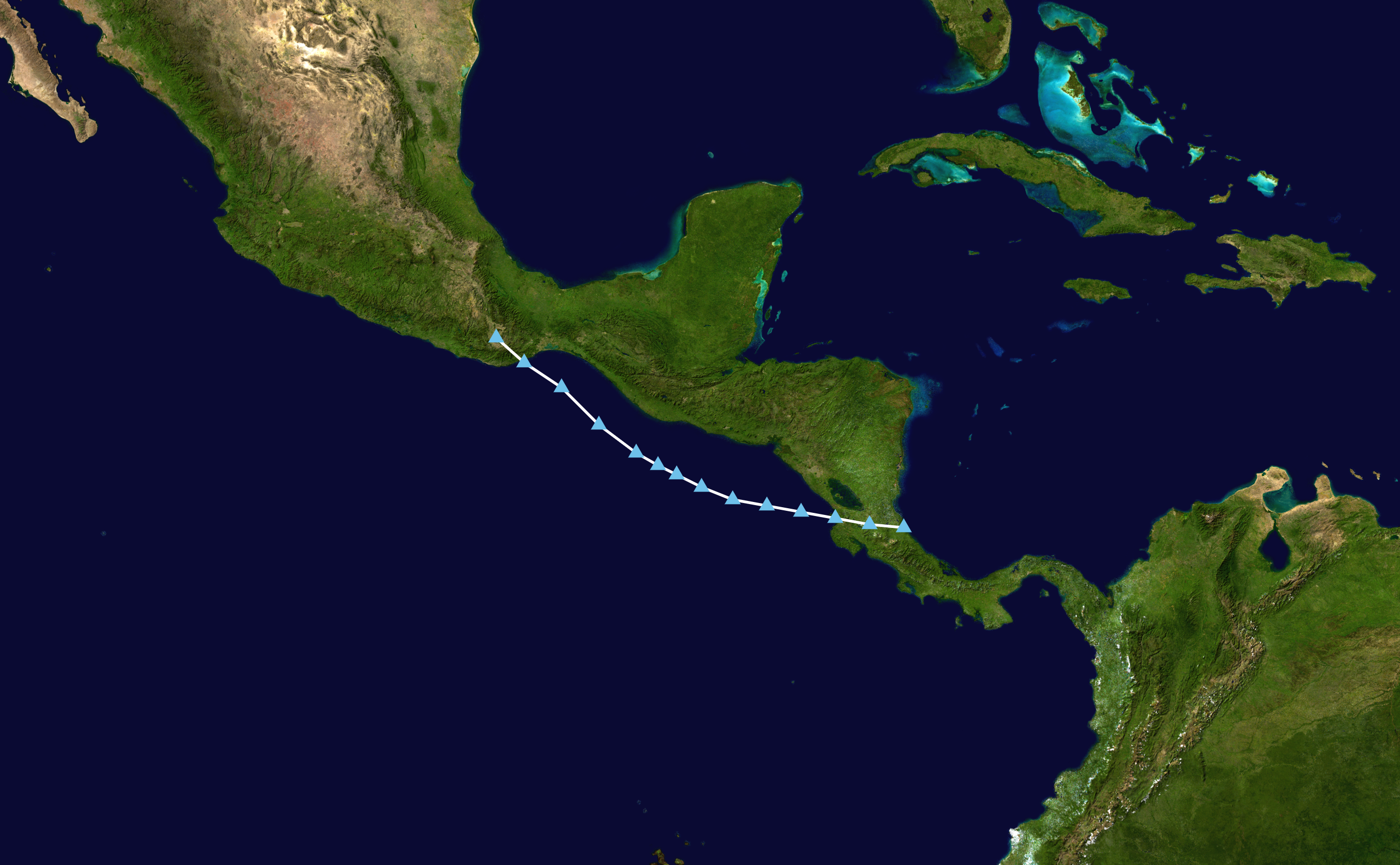
Map plotting the storm's track and intensity, according to the Saffir–Simpson scale Map key Saffir–Simpson scale Tropical depression (≤38 mph, ≤62 km/h) Tropical storm (39–73 mph, 63–118 km/h) Category 1 (74–95 mph, 119–153 km/h) Category 2 (96–110 mph, 154–177 km/h) Category 3 (111–129 mph, 178–208 km/h) Category 4 (130–156 mph, 209–251 km/h) Category 5 (≥157 mph, ≥252 km/h) Unknown Storm type Tropical cyclone Subtropical cyclone Extratropical cyclone, remnant low, tropical disturbance, or monsoon depression

A tropical wave located in the Caribbean Sea tracked westward, crossing over Central America and entering the Eastern Pacific Ocean around October 13–14. The National Hurricane Center (NHC) first forecast on October 11 that a broad low-pressure area would form within the next few days. By October 14, an area of low pressure had formed to the west of Nicaragua. Atmospheric convection, also known as thunderstorm activity, increased in organization as the system tracked northwestward, located to the south of Guatemala, on October 15. At the same time, the system was elongated and lacked a defined circulation center. The NHC initiated advisories on the disturbance as Potential Tropical Cyclone Seventeen-E early on October 16 after having assessed the chance of tropical cyclone formation to be high. The NHC expected the system to become a tropical storm before reaching the southern coast of Mexico as the latter was located within a favorable environment of warm sea surface temperatures and low-to-moderate northeasterly wind shear.

The system advanced towards the northwest, moving along the southwestern boundary of a mid-level ridge which was located over the Gulf of Mexico. Seventeen-E was estimated to have had maximum sustained winds of 35 mph (55 km/h) and a minimum pressure of 1,005 mbar (29.68 inHg) during its time as a potential tropical cyclone from 00:00 UTC to 18:00 UTC on October 16. The chance of Seventeen-E becoming a tropical cyclone rapidly decreased as it approached the shoreline. Convection decreased in its extent and became less structured; the low-level circulation also decayed, with multiple swirls of low-level clouds persisting near stronger areas of convection. The system moved ashore between Bahias de Huatulco and Salina Cruz, Oaxaca, around 13:00 UTC on October 16, and dissipated by 18:00 UTC.

== Impact ==
=== Mexico ===
A tropical storm watch was issued at 03:00 UTC on October 16 for the southern coast of Mexico, from Barra de Tonala to Puerto Escondido, since Seventeen-E was forecast to become a tropical storm before moving ashore. Seventeen-E produced torrential rainfall along the southern coast of Mexico, particularly in the Isthmus of Tehuantepec. A peak rainfall value of 445 mm (17.5 in) was recorded at km 51+740 in Oaxaca. Morro Mazatán experienced 401.4 mm (15.80 in) of rain and 278 mm (10.9 in) fell in Unión Hidalgo. Heavy rainfall also occurred in the states of Chiapas and Guerrero, with up to 70 mm (2.8 in) occurring in the former and 125 mm (4.9 in) in the latter. Classes were canceled in Oaxaca on October 16 while the storm was making landfall. The Unión Hidalgo municipal government asked the federal government to make a disaster declaration for the region. The Unión Hidalgo-Juchitán highway was severely damaged by the storm.

In Juchitán de Zaragoza, at least 100 homes, as well as schools, public buildings, and a library were inundated with water up to 500 mm (20 in) deep, exacerbating damage from the 2017 earthquake. Seawater flooded palapas and streets in Playa Vicente. The Río de los Perros rose to a level of 4.7 m (15 ft) and spilled its banks in multiple sections. A school was closed in the city as a result of the swollen river and flooding. Near the source of the river, in the Sierra Mix-Zapoteca neighborhood, water overtopped a bridge. River currents dragged garbage and tree branches downstream, forming a dam at the bridge; the river overflowed and flooded two streets. Police closed the bridge and the flooded streets. The river also overflowed in Juchitán's 8th section, with floodwaters submerging streets.

The communities of Barrio de La Soledad, Santa María, and Santo Domingo Tehuantepec were cut off after the Chapala River spilled its banks. Floodwaters topped three bridges leading to Barrio de La Soledad. The 99th Infantry Battalion of the Mexican Army was called in to assist people affected by the storm. Floodwaters inundated homes in Santo Domingo Tehuantepec and forced the closure of Highway 200 near Morro Mazatlán. In Guelaguichi, floodwaters isolated the community and damaged homes in one neighborhood. Drainage systems collapsed in Ciudad Ixtepec, allowing water to enter homes. A sewage canal overflowed in El Pitayal, damaging the homes of 50 families. Floodwaters up to 500 mm (20 in) inundated homes in the Lieza neighborhood. Multiple power outages were reported in the Santiago Astata and San Pedro Huamelula communities. Floodwaters also inundated homes in Rincón Moreno. Plan DN-III-E, a disaster relief and rescue plan, was activated in the states of Guerrero, Oaxaca, and Tabasco after the passage of Seventeen-E.

A river overflowed in Ometepec, Guerrero, sending floodwaters into the community of Talapa. A highway connecting the Ometepec and Igualapa municipalities was damaged and several streets were flooded. A vehicle was partially submerged in water; it was unknown whether people were inside it.

=== Central America ===
The disturbance produced torrential rainfall over multiple countries in Central America. In El Salvador, a 24-hour rainfall total of 102.4 mm (4.03 in) was reported in San Vicente. Totals of 91.6 mm (3.61 in) and 91 mm (3.6 in) occurred in Ahuachapán and La Libertad, respectively, for the same time period. At least six people were killed in El Salvador. In San Marcos, a 28-year-old man and a 21-year-old woman were killed after their house was buried. Likewise, a 68-year-old man and a 48-year-old woman died in Chiltiupán after a landside buried their house. A 61-year-old fisherman and another person were killed after being swept away by river currents. One person was reported missing in the country. Heavy rainfall forced the evacuation of at least 1,850 people to 17 shelters. A landslide in Mejicanos buried three homes; however, no fatalities occurred there. The Las Cañas river overflowed in Apopa, trapping a cargo truck, but the driver managed to escape. In Ilopango, one of the evacuated areas, at least 250 families were threatened by a 70 m (230 ft) deep gully. Over a hundred homes were flooded in the villages of La Cañada, El Icaco, and El Limón. At least 118 schools sustained damage, with 20 experiencing severe damage; classes were canceled for five days.

The rainfall prompted authorities to issue orange alerts for municipalities near the Salvadorian coast and yellow alerts for others. After the storm, a green alert was issued at the national level. Authorities worked to clear 135 landslides and 58 felled trees, moving over 4,000 m^{3} (140,000 ft^{3}) of debris. At least 19 sections of road were damaged by the landslides. Bean crops sustained damage throughout the country, with 183,060 quintals or 10 percent of the seasonal production having been destroyed.

In Guatemala, a peak rainfall total of 150 mm (5.9 in) was reported in Puerto de San José, and 133 mm (5.2 in) occurred in Flores, Petén. Throughout the nation, 1 person was killed, 2 people were wounded, and 216 people were evacuated. At least 302 houses had moderate damage and 2 were severely damaged. Multiple regions in the country were left without power. Villa Nueva was placed on alert after heavy rainfall caused a significant increase in the height of the Villalobos River. Several trees were felled and several landslides occurred in the area. Over 400 schools were closed nationwide during the storm. Quetzaltenango and Sacatepéquez experienced downed trees and flooding. Floodwaters impeded traffic in Guatemala City and inundated areas in Chimaltenango. A three-car accident occurred in Ciudad de Plata, with one vehicle damaging an under construction metro line stop. Winds felled a tree near San Lucas Sacatepéquez, causing it to damage a dining room at a hotel, killing one person and injuring two more.

The streets of several other towns were flooded, including Palajunoj, El Tejar, San Cristóbal, Villalobos, Escuintla, and Amatitlán. Municipal employees worked to remove a tree that fell on a residence in Mixco. A family was evacuated from their home after a wall partially collapsed. A landslide blocked two streets in the town. Rockslides and fallen trees impeded traffic in multiple locations along the Inter-American route. In Peronia City, 27 people were evacuated after rainfall damaged three homes; the structures were at risk of falling into a ravine. A landslide damaged a home in Bosques de San Lucas Sacatepéquez. An orange alert was issued for Puerto San José as a result of flooding. At least 13 departments were placed under yellow alerts and Escuintla was placed under an orange alert. Guatemalan President Jimmy Morales stated that the country had readied 127.9 metric tons (141 US tons) of emergency supplies. The town of Nueva Concepción received emergency aid after the storm.

== See also ==
- Weather of 2019
- Tropical cyclones in 2019
