= List of storms named Max =

The name Max has been used for six tropical cyclones in the Eastern Pacific Ocean and for one in the Australian region of the Indian Ocean.

In the Eastern Pacific:

- Tropical Storm Max (1981) – formed in the open ocean
- Hurricane Max (1987) – Category 4 hurricane that churned in the open ocean
- Tropical Storm Max (1993) – formed in the open ocean
- Hurricane Max (2005) – Category 1 hurricane that was no threat to land
- Hurricane Max (2017) – Category 1 hurricane that made landfall in southwestern Mexico
- Tropical Storm Max (2023) – made landfall in southwestern Mexico

In the Australian region:

- Cyclone Max (1981) – Category 3 tropical cyclone, crossed the Top End of Australia's Northern Territory, then moved west out to sea

== See also ==
- List of storms named Mac, a similar name used for tropical cyclones in the Western Pacific Ocean
