= Tropical Storm Cindy (2017) =

Atlantic tropical storm

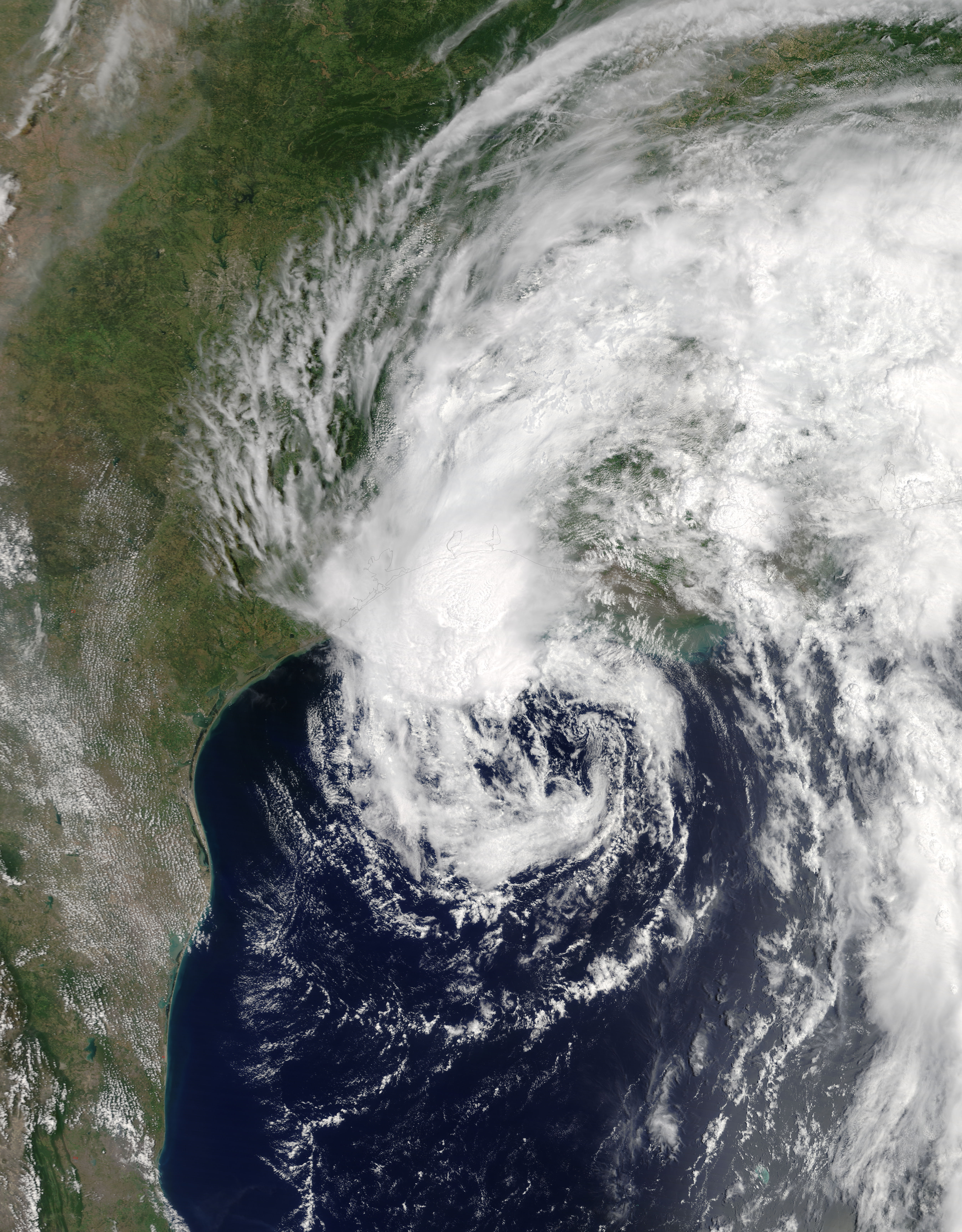
- Tropical Storm Cindy at peak intensity off the Louisiana coast on June 21

Meteorological history
- Formed: June 20, 2017
- Remnant low: June 23, 2017
- Dissipated: June 24, 2017

Tropical storm
- 1-minute sustained (SSHWS/NWS)
- Highest winds: 60 mph (95 km/h)
- Lowest pressure: 991 mbar (hPa); 29.26 inHg

Overall effects
- Fatalities: 2 direct; 1 indirect
- Damage: <$25 million (2017 USD)
- Areas affected: Central America, Yucatán Peninsula, Cayman Islands, Cuba, Southern United States, Eastern United States
- IBTrACS
- Part of the 2017 Atlantic hurricane season

Tropical Storm Cindy was a tropical cyclone in the Atlantic basin which became the first tropical cyclone to make landfall in Louisiana since Hurricane Isaac in 2012. The third named storm of the extremely active 2017 Atlantic hurricane season, Cindy formed out of a broad area of low pressure that developed in the northwestern Caribbean Sea near the Yucatán Peninsula in mid-June 2017. The disturbance gradually organized as it drifted northwards into the Gulf of Mexico, and was first designated as a potential tropical cyclone by the National Hurricane Center on June 19, before organizing into a tropical storm the next day. While slowly moving to the northwest, Cindy's intensification was slow due to the effects of dry air and moderate to strong wind shear. After peaking with sustained winds of 60 mph (95 km/h) on June 21, Cindy weakened slightly prior to making landfall in southwestern Louisiana on June 22. The storm quickly weakened after moving inland and degenerated into a remnant low on June 23, dissipating over the Mid-Atlantic on the following day.

Upon making landfall in Louisiana, the storm generated a peak storm surge up of 4.1 ft (1.2 m) and tides up to 6.38 ft (1.94 m) above normal in Vermilion Parish. However, coastal flooding mainly consisted of roads being inundated, while some beach erosion occurred. Due to Cindy's weak nature, only a few locations observed sustained tropical storm force winds. Consequently, wind damage was generally minor. Because the cyclone had an asymmetrical structure, heavy rainfall was observed over southeastern Mississippi, southwestern Alabama, and the far western Florida Panhandle, while lesser precipitation amounts fell over Louisiana and Texas. The storm and its remnants spawned 18 tornadoes throughout the Eastern United States, which caused just over $1.1 million (2017 USD) in damage. (Note: All damage figures are in 2017 USD, unless otherwise noted) Overall, damage from Cindy totaled less than $25 million. Three fatalities were attributed to the cyclone, two direct and one indirect.

== Meteorological history ==
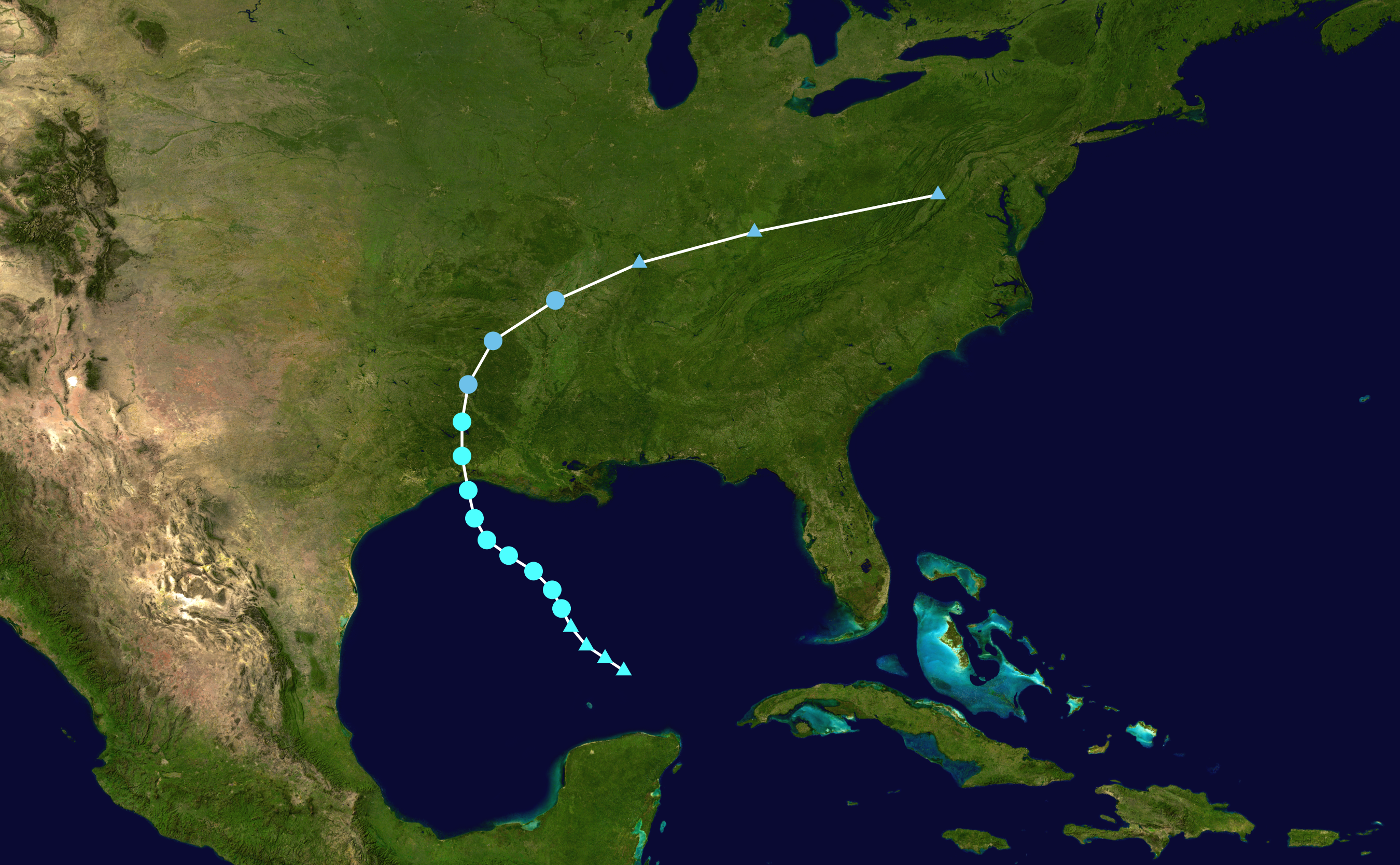
Map plotting the storm's track and intensity, according to the Saffir–Simpson scale Map key Saffir–Simpson scale Tropical depression (≤38 mph, ≤62 km/h) Tropical storm (39–73 mph, 63–118 km/h) Category 1 (74–95 mph, 119–153 km/h) Category 2 (96–110 mph, 154–177 km/h) Category 3 (111–129 mph, 178–208 km/h) Category 4 (130–156 mph, 209–251 km/h) Category 5 (≥157 mph, ≥252 km/h) Unknown Storm type Tropical cyclone Subtropical cyclone Extratropical cyclone, remnant low, tropical disturbance, or monsoon depression

In the second week of June, a large cyclonic gyre developed in the western Caribbean Sea during a positive phase of the Madden–Julian oscillation. Convection was enhanced by two tropical waves, with the first emerging into the Atlantic Ocean from the west coast of Africa on June 4 and reached the gyre between June 14 and June 15. As early as June 13, the National Hurricane Center (NHC) anticipated that a broad low pressure area would develop in the northwestern Caribbean Sea, which had the potential for tropical cyclogenesis. The second tropical wave began interacting with the gyre on June 17, resulting in the development of a broad low pressure area later that day. The system moved north-northwestward over the eastern Yucatán Peninsula on June 18, accompanied by gale-force winds in its eastern periphery, but no well-defined circulation. On the next day, the low moved into the Gulf of Mexico with a large area of disorganized convection. At 21:00 UTC on June 19, the NHC started issuing advisories on Potential Tropical Cyclone Three, due to the system's threat along the United States Gulf coast. At the time, the system had multiple circulations and no distinct center. Early on June 20, the Hurricane Hunters observed that multiple centers merged into a single circulation about 325 mi (525 km) south of Louisiana. The system moved to the north-northwest around a large ridge over the southeastern United States. With these observations, the disturbance was designated as Tropical Storm Cindy, which developed at 18:00 UTC on June 20 about 240 mi (390 km) south-southwest of the mouth of the Mississippi River, based on the increased organization of the center.

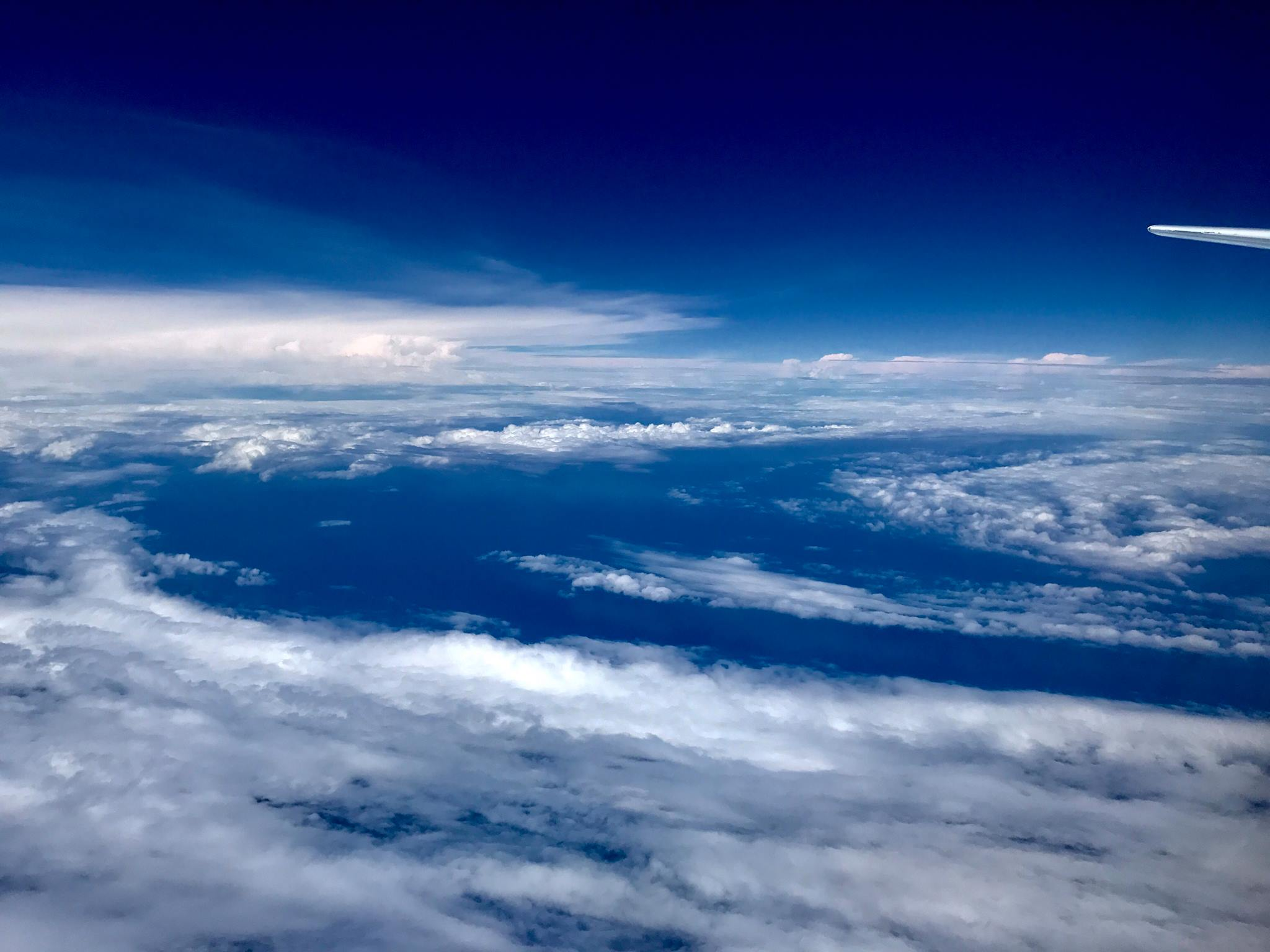
Cindy as seen from Douglas DC-8 during a scientific flight on June 21

The nascent Tropical Storm had its strongest winds northeast and northwest of the center in the primary area of convection. The thunderstorms were well north of the circulation due to strong wind shear and dry mid-level air. Early on June 21, despite a ragged satellite appearance, observations from the Hurricane Hunters and ships indicated that the storm intensified to reach maximum sustained winds of 60 mph (95 km/h) at 00:00 UTC. Cindy's broad structure and relatively unfavorable conditions prevented further strengthening. Around that time, the cyclone began moving north-northwest. At 09:00 UTC on June 21, the NHC noted that Cindy "does not look like a tropical cyclone" and rather resembled a subtropical cyclone, with a large circulation and most of the convection displaced to the east. The pressure bottomed out around 991 millibars (29.3 inHg) early on June 22, despite its atypical appearance on satellite; the only thing maintaining it at tropical characteristics was a burst of convection that occurred near the center which wrapped into the southwestern quadrant of the storm. Around 07:00 UTC that day, Cindy made landfall in extreme southwestern Louisiana just east of Sabine Pass with winds of 50 mph (85 km/h), making Cindy the first named storm to strike the state since Hurricane Isaac in 2012. Rapid weakening ensued once it moved inland, and it weakened to a depression shortly afterwards. At 21:00 UTC, the NHC issued their last advisory on Cindy and announced that further advisories would be issued by the Weather Prediction Center (WPC). Cindy continued to lose its tropical characteristics as it weakened gradually inland, and transitioned into a remnant low over western Kentucky at 18:00 UTC on June 23. The remnant low moved east-northeast across the Appalachia region and dissipated over the Mid-Atlantic states on the following day.

== Preparations ==
=== Northwestern Caribbean ===
In its formative stages, the precursor system dropped heavy rainfall across the Yucatán Peninsula, Central America, the Cayman Islands, western Cuba, and Florida. On June 16, Jamaica's Meteorological Service issued a nationwide flash flood watch for low-lying and flood prone areas.

=== United States ===
Infrared satellite loop of Cindy making landfall in Louisiana on June 22

The NHC issued multiple tropical storm watches and warnings across the northern Gulf Coast of the United States. The first warnings were issued at 21:00 UTC on June 19, with a tropical storm watch from Intracoastal City, Louisiana, to High Island, Texas, and a tropical storm warning from the Pearl River to Intracoastal City. At 09:00 UTC on the next day, the tropical storm watch between Interacoastal City and Cameron, was upgraded to a tropical storm warning. The tropical storm warning was extended westward to High Island at 15:00 UTC on June 20, while the tropical storm watch was modified to stretch from High Island to San Luis Pass. Six hours later, the tropical storm watch was replaced with a tropical storm warning. Early on June 21, the tropical storm warning was extended eastward to the Alabama–Florida state line. Thereafter, parts of the warning were gradually lifted, until the last remaining portion was discontinued at 15:00 UTC on June 22.

Alabama Governor Kay Ivey and Louisiana Governor John Bel Edwards declared state of emergencies for their respective states. The Louisiana National Guard strategically placed 33 boats and about 100 high-water vehicles in 14 parishes. About 125,000 meals and 200,000 liters were moved into Louisiana by the Federal Emergency Management Agency.

== Impact ==
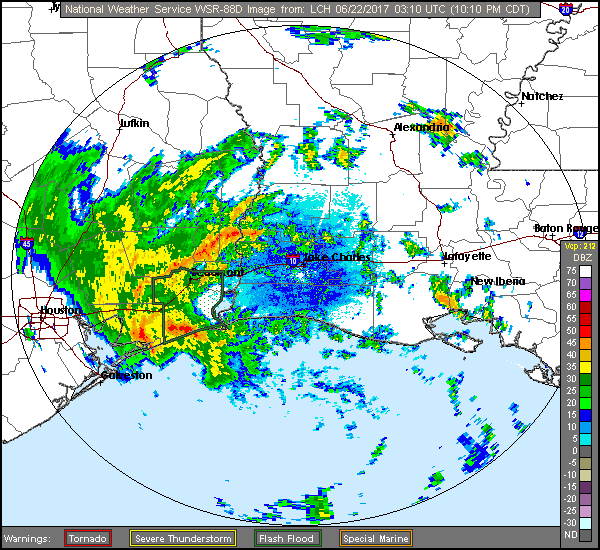
NWS Lake Charles radar image of Cindy a few hours before landfall

In the United States, Cindy produced heavy rainfall well to the east of its center, with general amounts of 7 to 10 in (180 to 250 mm) of precipitation falling over southeastern Mississippi, southwestern Alabama, and the far western Florida Panhandle, including a peak total of 18.69 in (475 mm) near Ocean Springs, Mississippi. As a result of its asymmetrical structure, Cindy produced less rainfall in Louisiana and Texas in the vicinity of where the storm moved ashore. Due to the weak nature of the cyclone, sustained winds reached tropical storm force at only a few locations, and consequently, wind damage was generally minor. The system and its remnants spawned 18 tornadoes, all of which were rated EF0 or EF1, with 6 in Alabama; 3 in West Virginia; 2 each in Florida, Kentucky, Mississippi, and New Jersey; and 1 in Pennsylvania.

Damage from Tropical Storm Cindy was less than $25 million. Because Cindy was just a weak tropical storm upon making landfall in southwestern Louisiana, the highest sustained wind speed observed was 40 mph (64 km/h) at the Lake Charles Regional Airport; a peak wind gust of 52 mph (84 km/h) was recorded at the same location. Consequently, wind impacts overall were minor. Rainfall was heavy in some areas, peaking at 7.82 in (199 mm) in St. Martinville. In Cameron Parish, low-lying areas were generally inundated with about 1 to 3 ft (0.30 to 0.91 m) of water, including portions of LA 27 near Hackberry and LA 82 near Grand Chenier and between Oak Grove and the Mermentau River. A number of roads were flooded in Calcasieu Parish, particularly in the vicinity of Lake Charles. Along the coast, storm surge peaked at 4.1 ft (1.2 m) and tides reached 6.38 ft (1.94 m) above normal; both observations occurred at the Freshwater Canal in Vermilion Parish. Nearby, the communities of Delcambre, Freshwater City, and Intracoastal City were flooded with 1 to 3 ft (0.30 to 0.91 m) of water. In Iberia Parish, coastal flooding caused several roads to be closed – including LA 83 near Lydia – and damaged some equipment at the Port of Iberia. Although well inland, portions of Calcasieu Parish, especially Lake Charles, Sulphur, and Westlake, experienced tidal flooding due to wind-driven storm surge traveling up the Calcasieu River.

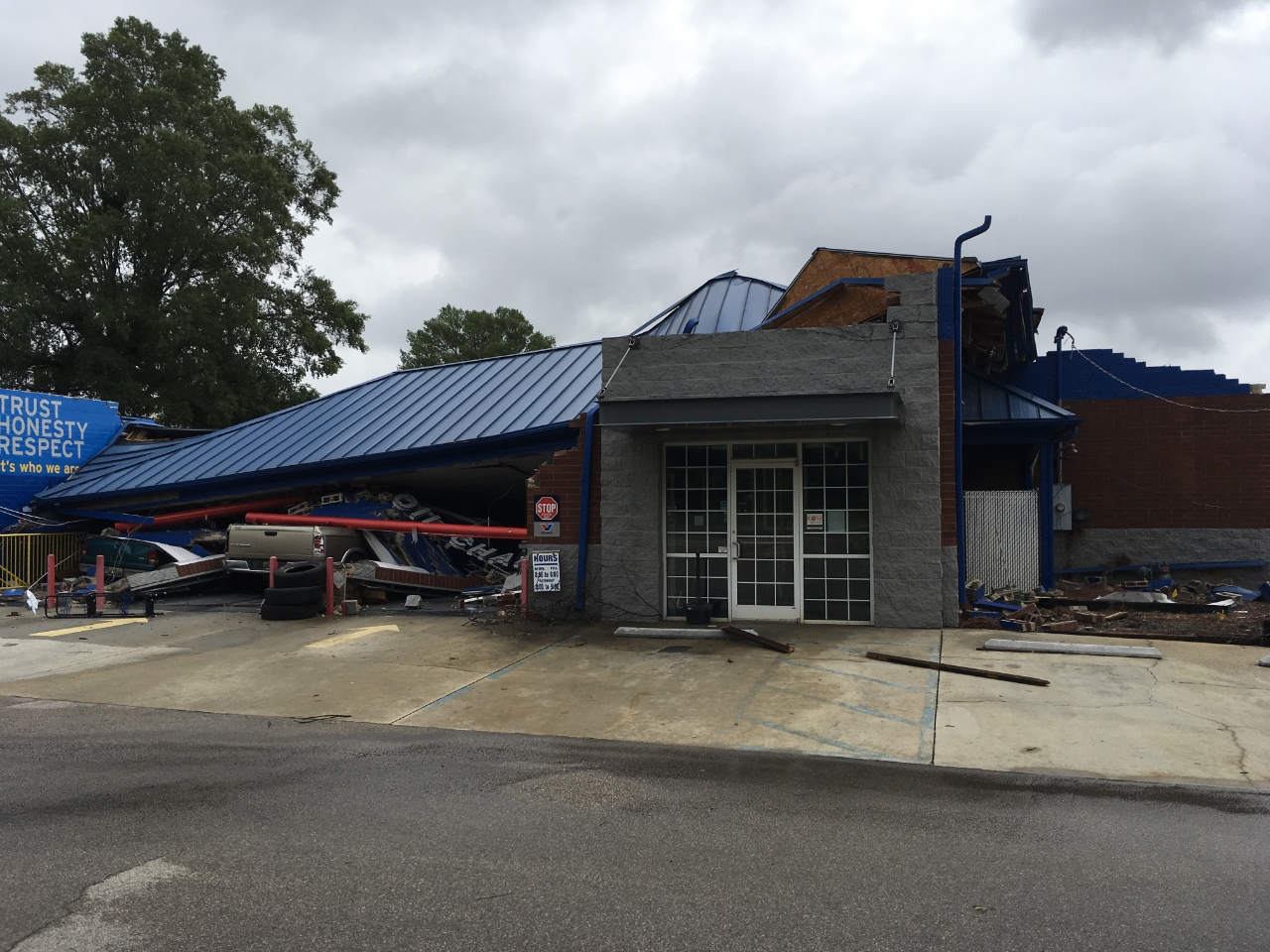
Damage to an Express Oil Change in Fairfield, Alabama following a high-end EF1 tornado.

Near Leakesville, Mississippi, heavy rainfall caused the Chickasawhay River to rise nearly 9 ft (3 m) past flood stage and overflow its banks, collapsing an abandoned bridge. In coastal Hancock County, Mississippi, over 300 streets were flooded. A shrimp trawler taking on water was rescued by the Coast Guard about 80 mi (130 km) offshore Galveston, Texas. Numerous streets were flooded across Alabama, and statewide power outages topped out near 4,300. Flash flooding increased bacteria levels in rivers and streams, with E. coli detected in the Coosa River. Multiple trees were downed in Walker County. The Tennessee Valley Authority lowered water levels in nine lakes across the state to limit the chances of flash flooding. Dozens of crashes were reported around Memphis, Tennessee, due to the strong winds and heavy rainfall; a driver was killed after going off the road and slamming into a pole. Over a half dozen fires may have been caused by Cindy. At the height of the storm, at least 10,000 residents in the city were left without power. AR 44 and AR 1 were forced to shut down. In South Bend, Indiana, strong winds peeled off part of the roof of a high school, damaging ten classrooms. Nearby low-lying roads were flooded, and emergency crews rescued people from stranded vehicles. Heavy rainfall also took place in the Northeastern United States, with over 3 inches (76 mm) of rain being reported in New Jersey and Pennsylvania.

=== Victims ===
Three deaths were reported, two direct and one indirect, with one each in Alabama, Tennessee, and Texas. A ten-year-old boy died in Fort Morgan, Alabama, after being struck in the chest by a log carried in a large wave. A second fatality took place in Bolivar Peninsula, Texas.

One home in Lake Charles suffered extensive damage after a tree fell on it, while a hollowed-out tree landed on a mobile home in Terrebonne Parish, injuring two children.

== See also ==
- Weather of 2017
- Tropical cyclones in 2017
- Other storms of the same name
- Tropical Storm Allison – damaging June tropical storm that hit Texas in 2001
- Tropical Storm Arlene (2005) – June tropical storm that hit Louisiana
- Tropical Storm Lee (2011) – slow-moving tropical storm which caused torrential rainfall and flooding in Louisiana
- Tropical Storm Bill (2015) – moderate tropical storm which struck eastern Texas
- Hurricane Barry (2019) – a hurricane that took a similar track to Cindy in July 2019
- Tropical Storm Cristobal (2020) – A June tropical storm that made landfall in Louisiana in 2020.
- Tropical Storm Claudette (2021) – A June tropical storm that also made landfall in Louisiana in 2021.
