= Tropical Storm Alex (2022) =

Atlantic tropical storm

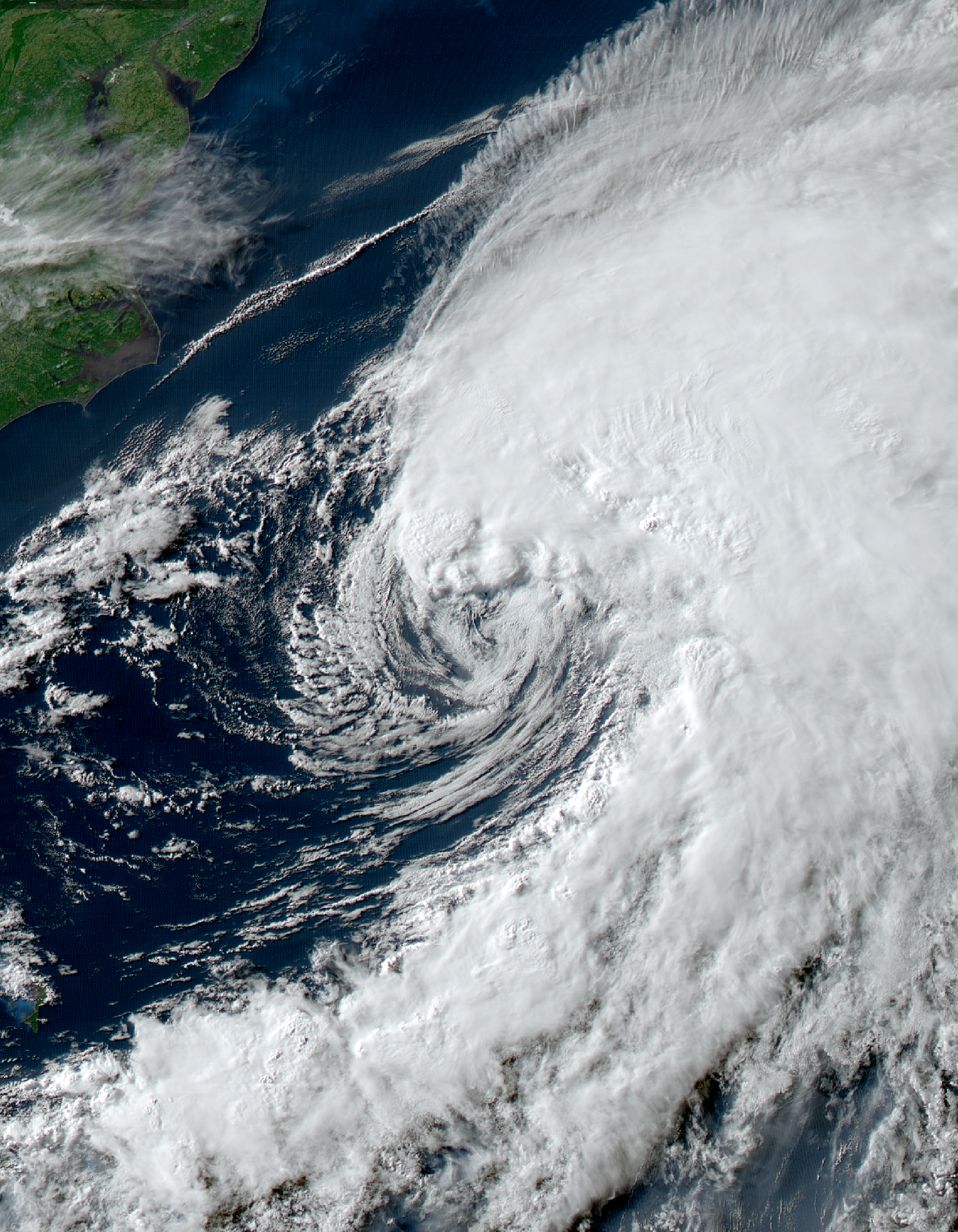
- Tropical Storm Alex near peak intensity west of Bermuda late on June 5

Meteorological history
- Formed: June 5, 2022
- Post-tropical: June 6, 2022
- Dissipated: June 7, 2022

Tropical storm
- 1-minute sustained (SSHWS/NWS)
- Highest winds: 70 mph (110 km/h)
- Lowest pressure: 984 mbar (hPa); 29.06 inHg

Overall effects
- Fatalities: 4 total
- Damage: $408 million (2022 USD)
- Areas affected: Yucatán Peninsula, western Cuba, Florida, the Bahamas, Bermuda
- IBTrACS
- Part of the 2022 Atlantic hurricane season

Tropical Storm Alex was a strong and fast moving tropical storm that caused flash flooding in western Cuba and South Florida while developing into the first named storm of the 2022 Atlantic hurricane season. Alex originated from a broad area of low pressure partially related to the remnants of Hurricane Agatha in the Eastern Pacific. The National Hurricane Center (NHC) initiated advisories on it as Potential Tropical Cyclone One over the eastern Yucatán Peninsula on June 2. Wind shear and dry air kept the system disorganized until after it crossed Florida two days later. Finally, on June 5, the system became sufficiently organized and was named Alex while located north of Grand Bahama Island. Later that same day, Alex's winds briefly strengthened to 70 mph (110 km/h). The storm brought rain and strong winds to Bermuda on June 6, before becoming a post-tropical cyclone that same day. Alex formed four days after the official start of the season, making the 2022 Atlantic hurricane season the first since 2014 not to have a pre-season named storm.

There were no reports of damage or casualties associated with Alex while it was a tropical storm. Its precursor disturbance, however, flooded streets and caused numerous power outages in Florida. Additionally, in Cuba, the storm caused flooding and mudslides, which killed four people, damaged dozens of homes and knocked out electricity in various areas.

== Meteorological history ==
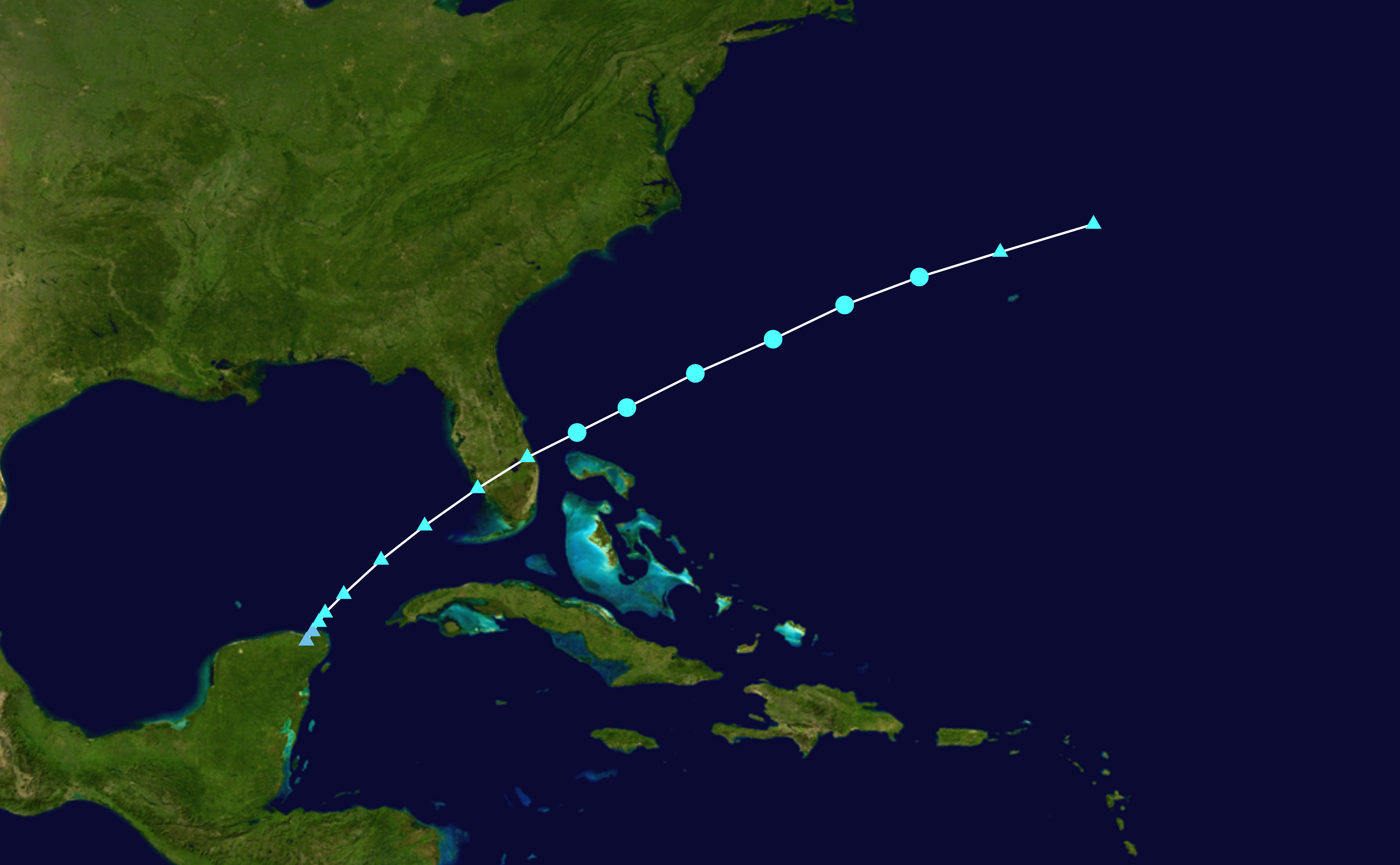
Map plotting the storm's track and intensity, according to the Saffir–Simpson scale Map key Saffir–Simpson scale Tropical depression (≤38 mph, ≤62 km/h) Tropical storm (39–73 mph, 63–118 km/h) Category 1 (74–95 mph, 119–153 km/h) Category 2 (96–110 mph, 154–177 km/h) Category 3 (111–129 mph, 178–208 km/h) Category 4 (130–156 mph, 209–251 km/h) Category 5 (≥157 mph, ≥252 km/h) Unknown Storm type Tropical cyclone Subtropical cyclone Extratropical cyclone, remnant low, tropical disturbance, or monsoon depression

On May 31, a large low-pressure area developed near the Yucatán Peninsula, partially related to the Pacific basin remnants of Hurricane Agatha interacting with an upper-level trough over the Gulf of Mexico. The low produced a large area of disorganized showers and thunderstorms as it moved across the Yucatán over the ensuing few days. Due to the prospect that the disturbance might become a tropical depression or tropical storm with impacts in portions of Florida and western Cuba, it was designated as Potential Tropical Cyclone One on June 2, while located about 75 mi (120 km) north-northwest of Cozumel, Quintana Roo. Around this time, surface observations and satellite imagery noted that the system remained disorganized due to southwesterly wind shear, with deep convection displaced from the estimated center.

Early on the following day, Hurricane hunters estimated that the system was producing tropical storm-force winds and reported a low-level wind shift, but found no conclusive evidence of a closed circulation. Scatterometer data early on June 4 indicated the system had an elongated region of light winds and still lacked a well-defined center. Shortly after 12:00 UTC, the system struck the west coast of Florida between Cape Coral and Naples. After moving into the Atlantic later on June 4, the system's circulation started to become better defined. At 00:00 UTC on June 5, the disturbance finally established a well-defined center with sufficient convection, becoming Tropical Storm Alex approximately about 85 mi (140 km) north of Grand Bahama Island. By 18:00 UTC, Alex reached its peak intensity with maximum winds of 70 mph (110 km/h) and a minimum central pressure of 984 mbar (29.06 inHg). After peaking, it weakened slightly and began to lose its tropical characteristics. By 12:00 UTC on June 6, the storm had transitioned to a post-tropical cyclone about 105 mi (165 km) north-northwest of Bermuda. Then, 12 hours later, the cyclone was absorbed within a baroclinic zone. A few hours later however, a new area of low pressure formed in association with the deepening trough. And, energized by Alex's remnants, it soon was producing hurricane-force winds as it moved over the central Atlantic, On June 10–11, the new low passed between Iceland and the northern coast of the United Kingdom near the Faroe Islands. Then, it rapidly weakened while moving toward Norway which it reached on June 13.

== Preparations and impact ==
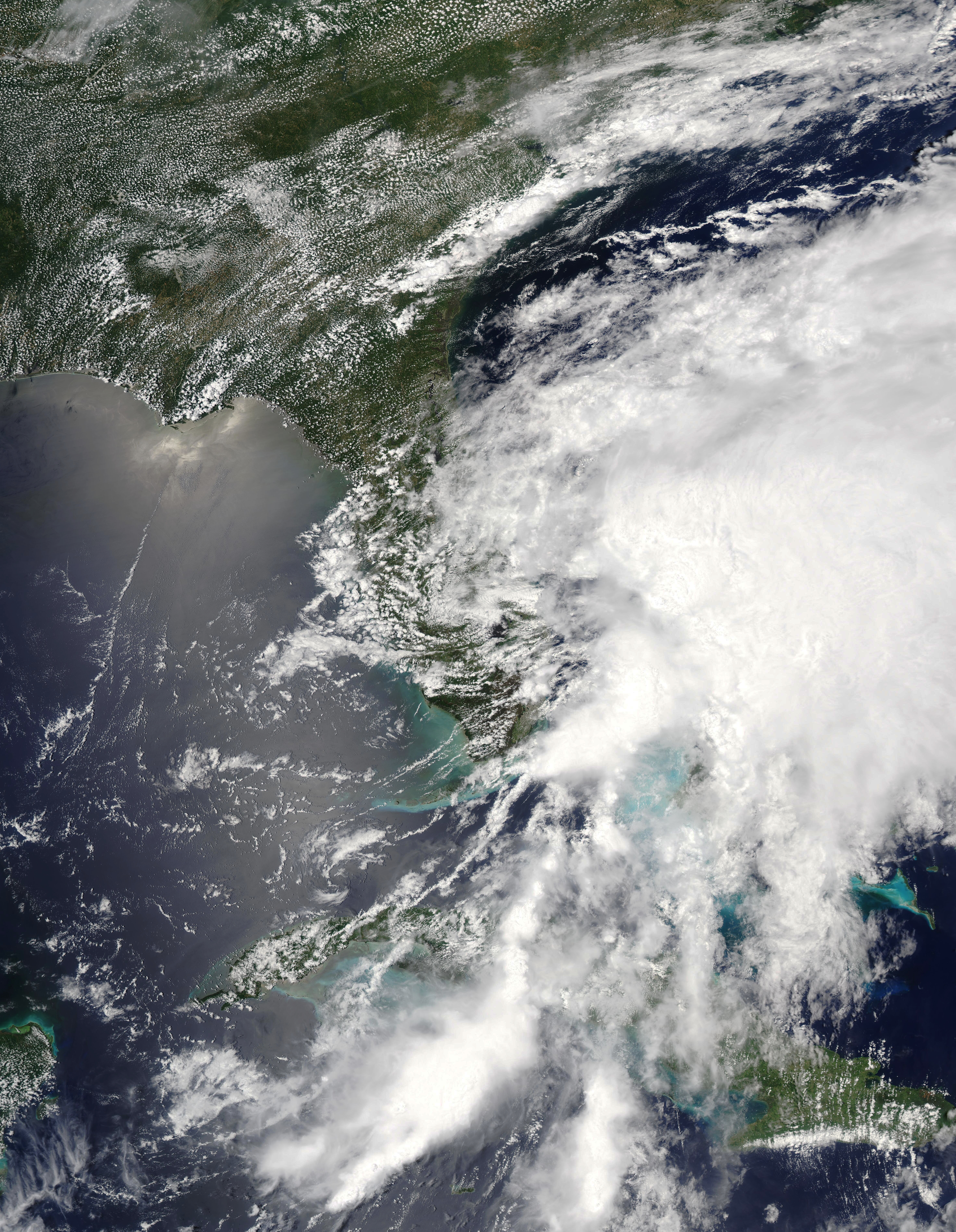
Potential Tropical Cyclone One over South Florida on June 4

=== Cuba ===
Upon the initiation of advisories on Potential Tropical Cyclone One at 21:00 UTC on June 2 the government of Cuba issued a tropical storm watch for Artemisa, La Habana, Matanzas, Mayabeque, and Pinar del Rio provinces, as well as Isla de la Juventud. Heavy rain fell throughout western Cuba as the developing storm moved through the Gulf of Mexico, including a 30-hour total of 11.9 in (301 mm) of precipitation in Paso Real de San Diego, in Pinar del Río. The government reported that up to 4,480 people had been displaced in the province. The rains caused the Cuyaguateje River to overflow its banks, in what some longtime residents of Camino Verde, in the municipality of Guane, described as the worst flooding since Hurricane Alberto in 1982. In La Habana, rains caused 61 landslides around Havana. Altogether, there were four storm related fatalities reported in Cuba: two in the Pinar del Río Province and two in Havana. Approximately 750 homes suffered varying degrees of damage, 21 of which were destroyed, and 158,000 customers lost power. Roughly 3,200 hectares (7,900 acres) of crops were damaged. According to AON, damages from flooding totaled at least US$25 million.

=== Florida ===
The NHC began posting tropical storm watches for Florida, encompassing the state's west coast south of Longboat Key, the east coast from the Brevard–Volusia county line southward, Lake Okeechobee, Florida Bay, and the entirety of the Florida Keys. In addition, parts of South Florida were put under a flash flood warning. Likewise, South Florida also experienced heavy rains in association with the precursor of Alex. Several locations observed at least 10 in (250 mm) of precipitation, including preliminary totals of 14.85 in (377 mm) in Hollywood, 14.79 in (376 mm) near Margate, 12.72 in (323 mm) near Biscayne Park, 11.02 in (280 mm) near Palmetto Bay, and at least 11 in (280 mm) in Downtown Miami. Consequently, street flooding occurred in South Florida, especially from Miami-Dade County to southern Palm Beach County, leading to a few road closures and stalling cars, necessitating the rescue of several stranded motorists via the Miami-Dade Fire Rescue Department. The precursor to Alex also generated tropical storm-force wind gusts in the Miami metropolitan area, causing a combined 3,543 power outages in Broward and Miami-Dade counties. In Pompano Beach, winds toppled a large tree onto a mobile home, rendering the residence uninhabitable. Damages across the state from the disturbance totaled $104,000, with Broward County reporting $50,000 in damage from the 40 to 50 miles per hour (64 to 80 km/h) winds. According to AON, flood damages across the state were US$383 million.

=== The Bahamas ===
The Government of the Bahamas issued a tropical storm watch and then a tropical storm warning for its northwestern islands. The Bermuda Weather Service issued a tropical storm watch for Bermuda, which was raised to a tropical storm warning as the system approached.

== See also ==
- Weather of 2022
- Timeline of the 2022 Atlantic hurricane season
- Tropical cyclones in 2022
- Other storms named Alex
- List of Florida hurricanes (2000–present)
