= Tropical Storm Max (2023) =

East Pacific tropical storm in 2023

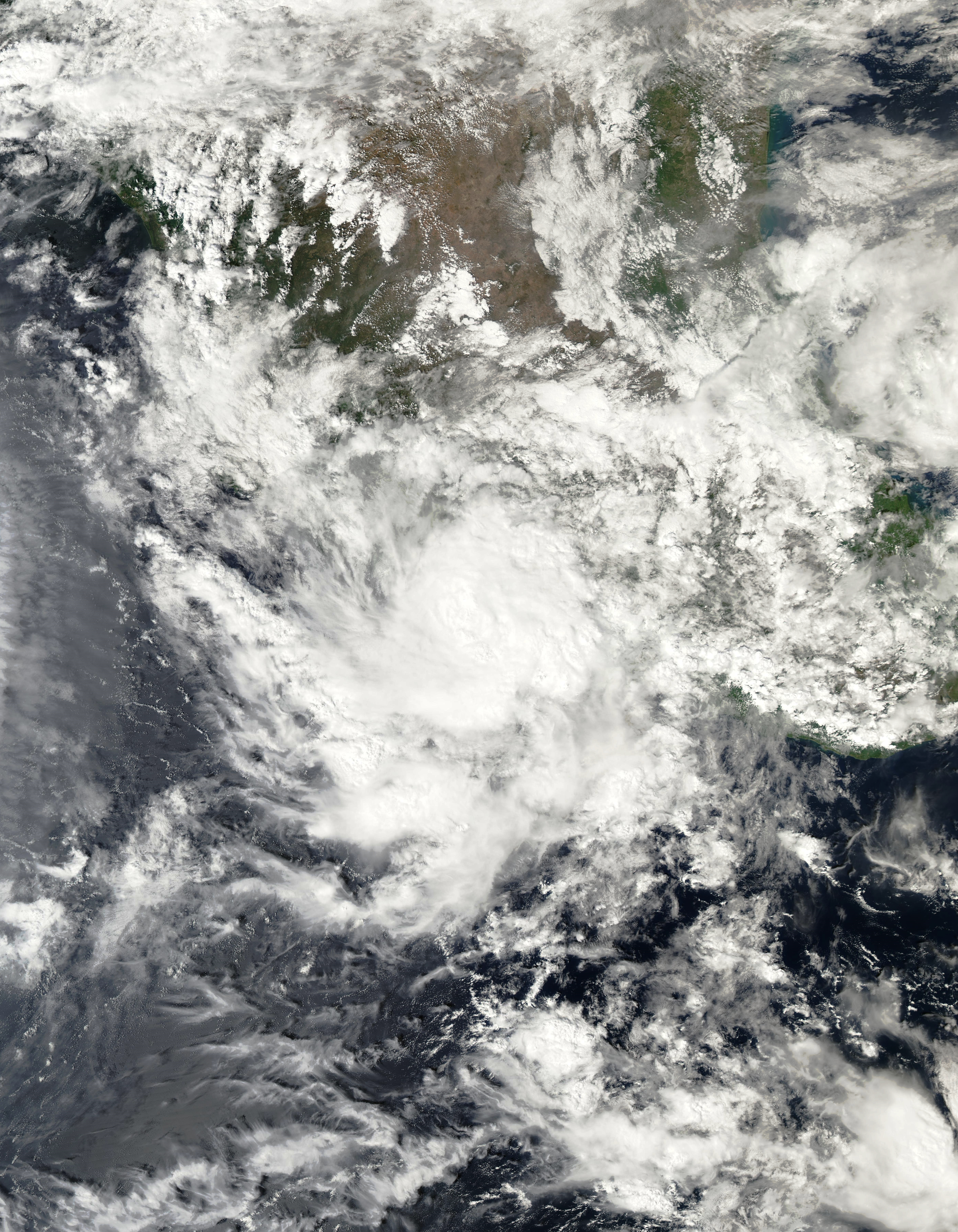
- Tropical Storm Max making landfall on Guerrero at peak intensity on October 9

Meteorological history
- Formed: October 8, 2023
- Dissipated: October 10, 2023

Tropical storm
- 1-minute sustained (SSHWS/NWS)
- Highest winds: 70 mph (110 km/h)
- Lowest pressure: 990 mbar (hPa); 29.23 inHg

Overall effects
- Fatalities: 2 total
- Damage: $38.6 million (2023 USD)
- Areas affected: Southwestern Mexico, Central Mexico, Gulf Coast of the United States
- Part of the 2023 Pacific hurricane season

Tropical Storm Max was a compact, strong tropical storm that was the first of four tropical cyclones to make landfall along the Pacific Coast of Mexico in October 2023. The sixteenth tropical depression and thirteenth named storm of the 2023 Pacific hurricane season, Max originated from a trough that developed to the southwest of Central America on October 3, 2023. Showers and thunderstorms associated with the disturbance gradually became better organized over the following days as it moved west-northwestwards to the south of Mexico. The disturbance was designated Potential Tropical Cyclone Sixteen-E on October 7 by the United States National Hurricane Center (NHC), as it had not yet become a tropical cyclone but was threatening the southwestern coast of Mexico. The disturbance developed a more well-defined circulation the following day and developed into a tropical depression; the depression strengthened into a tropical storm late on October 8 and was assigned the name Max. Max progressed northward toward the coast of Mexico and quickly strengthened; the storm made landfall near Puerto Vicente, Guerrero at 18:00 UTC on October 9 just below hurricane strength. Max rapidly weakened as it moved inland across southern Mexico and dissipated the following morning over the region's mountainous terrain.

Max resulted in significant flooding and strong winds across much of the coast of southwestern Mexico. Two deaths were reported in the Mexican state of Guerrero due to the storm, while an additional two people were seriously injured. The storm caused 702 million pesos (US$38.6 million) in damage to Guerrero's commercial sector alone. Areas of southern Mexico affected by Max, particularly Guerrero, were severely affected by the much more powerful Hurricane Otis just two weeks after Max's landfall.

== Meteorological history ==
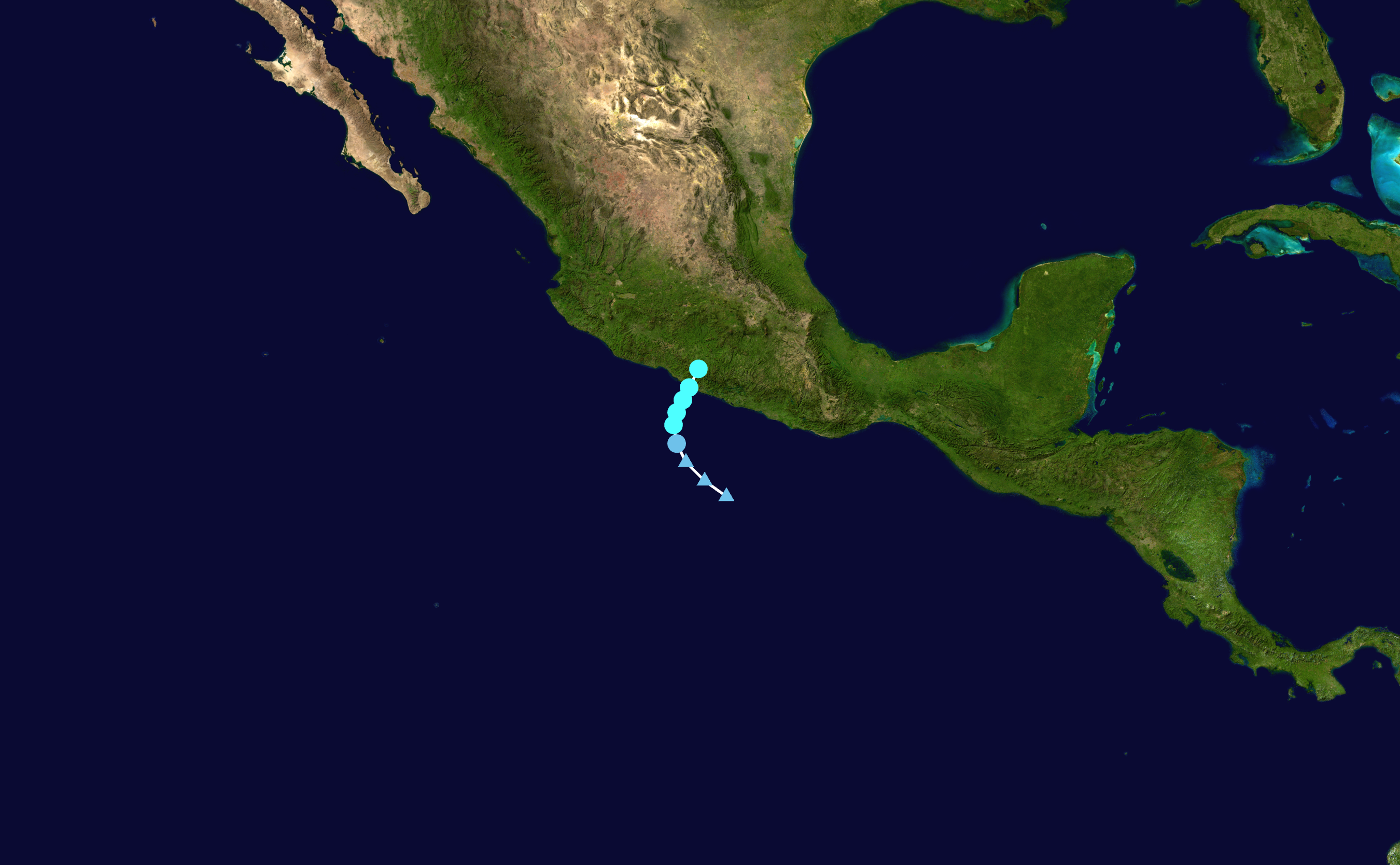
Map plotting the storm's track and intensity, according to the Saffir–Simpson scale Map key Saffir–Simpson scale Tropical depression (≤38 mph, ≤62 km/h) Tropical storm (39–73 mph, 63–118 km/h) Category 1 (74–95 mph, 119–153 km/h) Category 2 (96–110 mph, 154–177 km/h) Category 3 (111–129 mph, 178–208 km/h) Category 4 (130–156 mph, 209–251 km/h) Category 5 (≥157 mph, ≥252 km/h) Unknown Storm type Tropical cyclone Subtropical cyclone Extratropical cyclone, remnant low, tropical disturbance, or monsoon depression

A tropical wave left the coast of Africa between September 19–20. Moving westward across the tropical Atlantic Ocean, the wave contributed to the formation of Tropical Storm Philippe to its north on September 23. The wave crossed Central America several days later, entering the eastern Pacific Ocean on October 3. A broad low-pressure area developed in association with the wave several hundred miles south of Mexico around 6:00 UTC on October 4. The disturbance progressed slowly northwestward within an environment conducive to tropical cyclogenesis. The convective (shower and thunderstorm) activity associated with the disturbance initially remained limited and disorganized; however, the system began to become more organized on October 6 amid favorable environmental conditions just southwest of the Gulf of Tehuantepec. The disturbance continued to become better organized and develop more convective activity over the following day, although it still lacked curvature in its rainbands and a well-defined center; despite this, due to the impending threat it posed to the Mexican coastline, the system was designated a potential tropical cyclone at 3:00 UTC on October 8 and given the designation Sixteen-E.

Sixteen-E continued to develop a more organized, cyclonic structure throughout October 8 as it moved slowly northwest, between a ridge to its northeast, over the Gulf of Mexico, and Tropical Storm Lidia to its west. The development of a more well-defined center and tight, spiral rainbands allowed the system to finally develop into a tropical depression by 18:00 UTC that day, about 125 nautical miles south of Zihuatanejo. An increase in convective intensity and the development of gale-force winds allowed Sixteen-E to strengthen to a tropical storm six hours later, and it was assigned the name Max. Max continued to move northward and strengthen as it neared the Mexican coastline, over warm sea surface temperatures of 86 °F (30 °C) while wind shear over the system decreased. The storm rapidly intensified by 55 km/h (35 mph) over a 24-hour period beginning on 18:00 UTC on October 8. The storm also began to develop an eye early the next day. Max achieved peak intensity as a strong tropical storm at 18:00 UTC on October 9, with maximum sustained winds of 115 km/h (70 mph) and a minimum barometric pressure of 29.23 inHg (990 mbar). The storm made landfall at peak intensity near the town of Puerto Vicente, Guerrero shortly thereafter. Max rapidly weakened as it moved inland over southern Mexico's mountainous terrain. The storm dissipated inland around 6:00 UTC on October 10.

== Preparations and impact ==
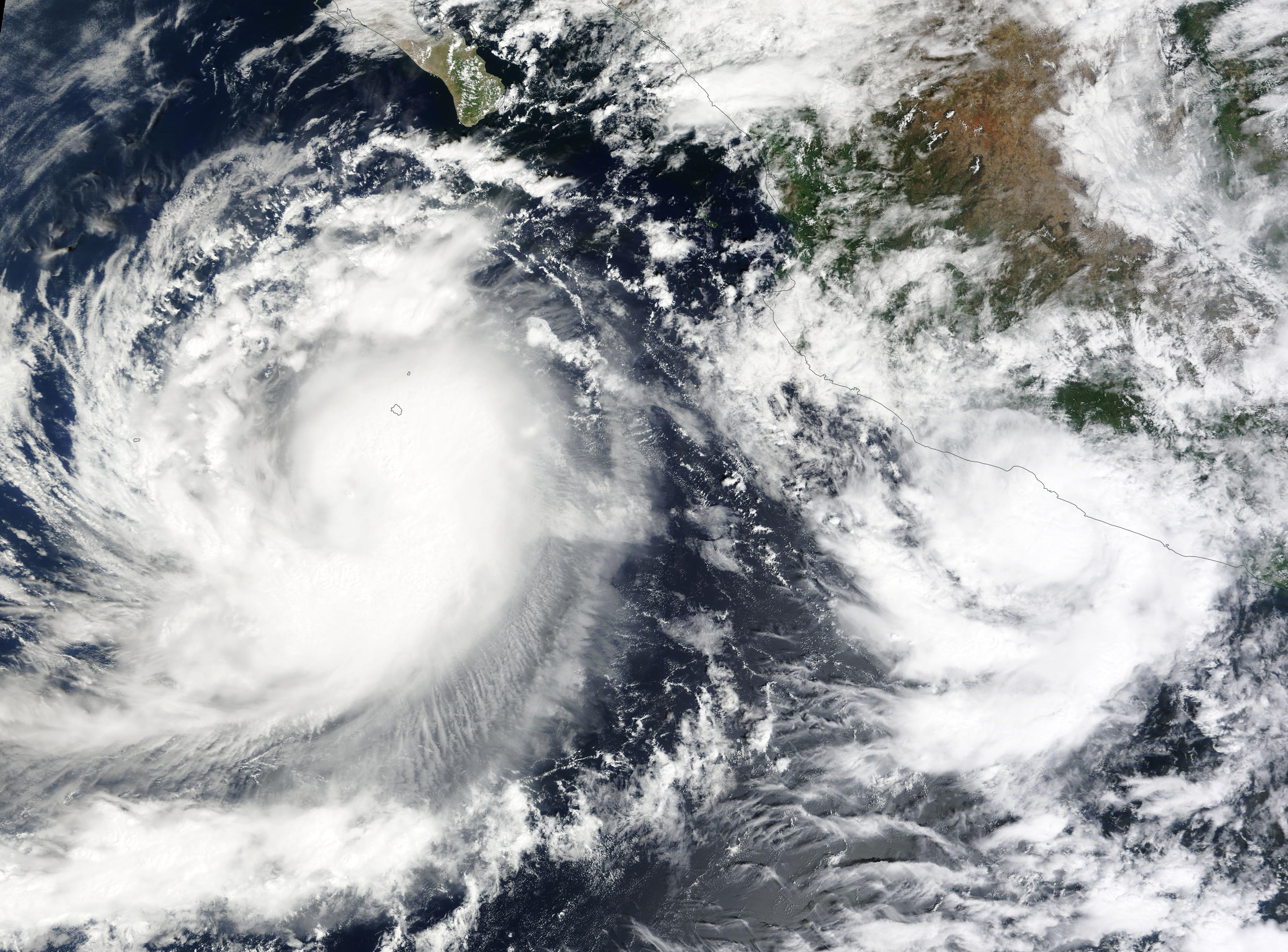
Max (right) nearing landfall, with Hurricane Lidia (left) strengthening, on October 9

Tropical storm watches and warnings were issued for a broad swath of the southwestern coast of Mexico as Max approached the area, in anticipation of severe flooding and mudslides from the storm, as well as predicted rainfall of up to 300 mm (12 in). Shelters were set up in advance of the storm in the municipalities of Tecpán de Galeana, Petatlán, Coyuca de Benítez, Acapulco and Zihuatanejo de Azueta. In-person classes were cancelled across Guerrero ahead of the cyclone's landfall, as well as in the states of Nayarit and Jalisco due to the dual threat of Max and the more powerful and northerly-tracking Hurricane Lidia.

Widespread flooding of homes and roadways occurred along Max's track throughout Guerrero. Torrential rainfall, damage to houses, road closures, landslides, fence collapses, fallen trees and poles, and overflowing rivers were all reported across several coastal municipalities. Extensive flooding was recorded throughout Michoacán, Guerrero and Oaxaca, with several areas reporting accumulations of up to 250 mm (9.8 in) across the latter two states. Winds of up to 60 mph (95 km/h) were recorded as well. Flash flooding washed out streets and public areas in Acapulco. Max caused numerous rivers and streams to overflow their banks, which in turn flooded over 90 homes, four of which collapsed completely, and felled many trees. Two deaths occurred in relation to Max, both in the municipality of Tecpán de Galeana in Guerrero: one when a van fell into a sinkhole, and the other due to drowning in a flooded river. The storm caused an additional sinkhole to form on a highway connecting Acapulco and Zihuatanejo along the coast. An additional two people had to be rescued by helicopter after being stuck in a tree for nearly 10 hours due to the flooding of a river. Max created dangerous swells and rip currents across the Mexican coast, affecting the tropical storm warning area from Acapulco to Lázaro Cárdenas. Blackouts generated by the storm affected 80% of the state's commercial sector. Total losses in Guerrero reached 702 million pesos (US$38.6 million), with 2 million pesos (US$110,000) in damage to vehicles alone. Max continued to generate heavy rains across Guerrero and further inland into October 10 and 11 as its remnant moisture spread over central Mexico.

Following the storm, the Mexican federal government signed an emergency declaration for the Guerrerense municipalities of Benito Juárez, Atoyac de Álvarez, Tecpan de Galeana and Coyuca de Benítez, to allow affected residents to receive shelter, food and aid. The damage Max delivered to crops, livestock and infrastructure across Guerrero would later be heavily compounded by the extremely powerful and destructive Hurricane Otis, which struck the state less than two weeks after Max and hampered recovery efforts. The influx of tropical moisture from Max and Hurricane Lidia caused several days of hotter and wetter weather across several states in southwestern and central Mexico. The remnants of the storms also combined with a frontal boundary over the Gulf of Mexico and contributed to beneficial rainfall along the Gulf Coast of the United States, which was suffering from drought conditions.

== See also ==
- Weather of 2023
- Tropical cyclones in 2023
- Timeline of the 2023 Pacific hurricane season
- List of Eastern Pacific tropical storms
- Other tropical cyclones named Max
- Tropical Storm Odile (2008) – Peaked at a comparable intensity and affected similar areas
- Tropical Storm Trudy (2014) – Another strong tropical storm that struck southern Mexico in October
- Tropical Storm Ileana (2018) – Had a similar intensity and effects
