= Florencio Villarreal =

Municipality in the Mexican state of Guerrero

- Municipality
- Location in Mexico
- Coordinates: 16°43′26″N 99°07′24″W
- Country: Mexico
- State: Guerrero
- Municipal seat: Cruz Grande

Area
  - Total: 372.9 km^{2} (144.0 sq mi)

Population (2005)
  - Total: 18,713

Florencio Villarreal is a municipality in the Mexican state of Guerrero. The municipal seat lies at Cruz Grande. The municipality covers an area of 372.9 km^{2}. It is named after Col. Florencio Villarreal, who drafted the 1854 Plan of Ayutla that ousted the conservative dictator Antonio López de Santa Anna. Ousting Santa Anna initiated a new era in Mexican politics with the liberals in charge, known as La Reforma. Leaders in Guerrero took the lead in rebelling against Santa Anna's government.

In 2005, the municipality had a total population of 18,713.
