= San Marcos Municipality, Guerrero =

Municipality in the Mexican state of Guerrero

San Marcos
- Municipality
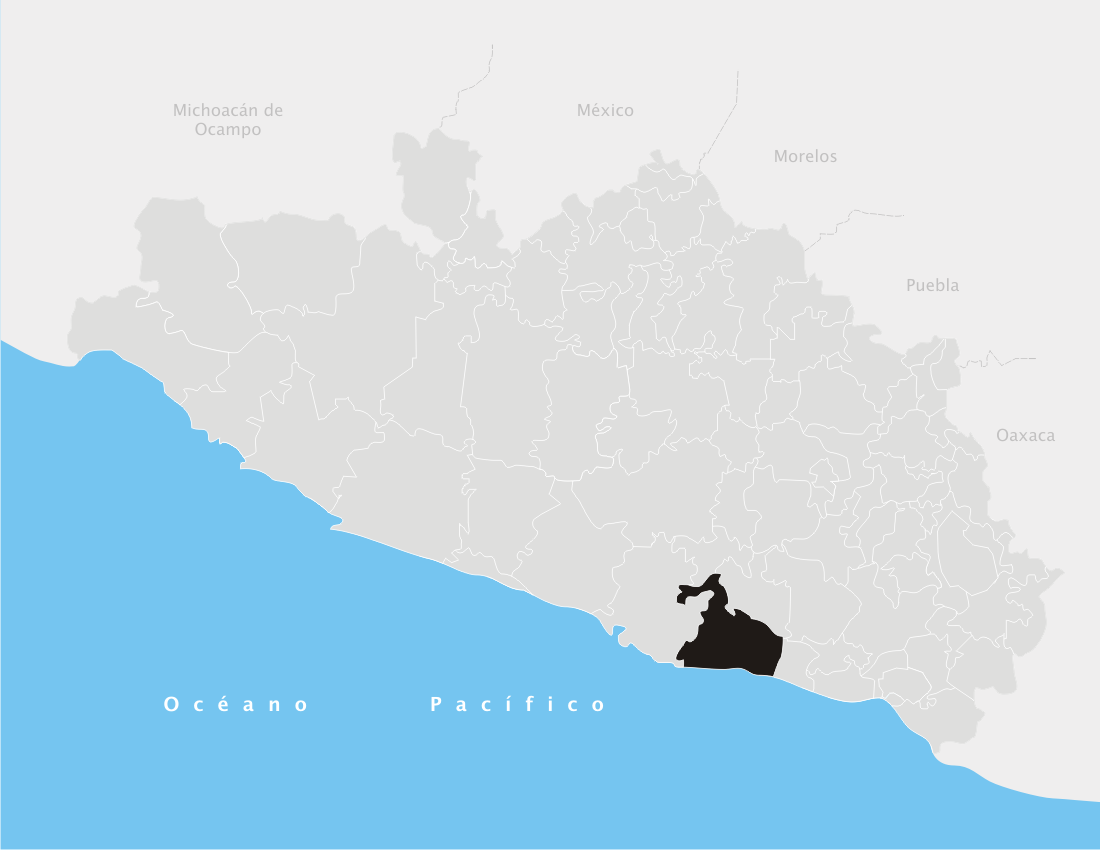
- San Marcos in Guerrero

- Location in Mexico
- Coordinates: 17°25′N 99°20′W
- Country: Mexico
- State: Guerrero
- Municipal seat: San Marcos
- Founded: 28 September 1885

Area
  - Total: 960.7 km^{2} (370.9 sq mi)
- Elevation: 30 m (98 ft)

Population (2005)
  - Total: 44,959

San Marcos is a municipality in the Mexican state of Guerrero. Its municipal seat is the town of San Marcos.

The municipality of San Marcos covers an area of 960.7 km² and is home to approximately 50 000 inhabitants. Ethnically, the population is mainly indigenous with a considerable mixing with African and to a lesser extent, European settlers, making most sanmarqueños Zambos. It comprises 138 villages and towns, examples of which include El Cortes, Las Vigas, El Cerro, Vista Hermosa, Tecomate de Pesqueria, Monte Alto, Santo Domingo, Las Ramaditas and others. Many sanmarqueños have migrated to various places in the United States, including the San Francisco Bay Area (mainly Oakland), Southern California (mainly Los Angeles, Santa Ana, and San Diego), Arizona, Chicago Illinois, Atlanta Georgia, Winston Salem North Carolina, South Florida, Washington State, as well as Houston and Dallas Texas.
