= Cruz Grande =

City in the Mexican state of Guerrero

- Municipal seat and city
- Location in Mexico Cruz Grande (Mexico)
- Coordinates: 16°44′N 99°8′W
- Country: Mexico
- State: Guerrero
- Municipality: Florencio Villarreal
- Time zone: UTC-6 (Zona Centro)

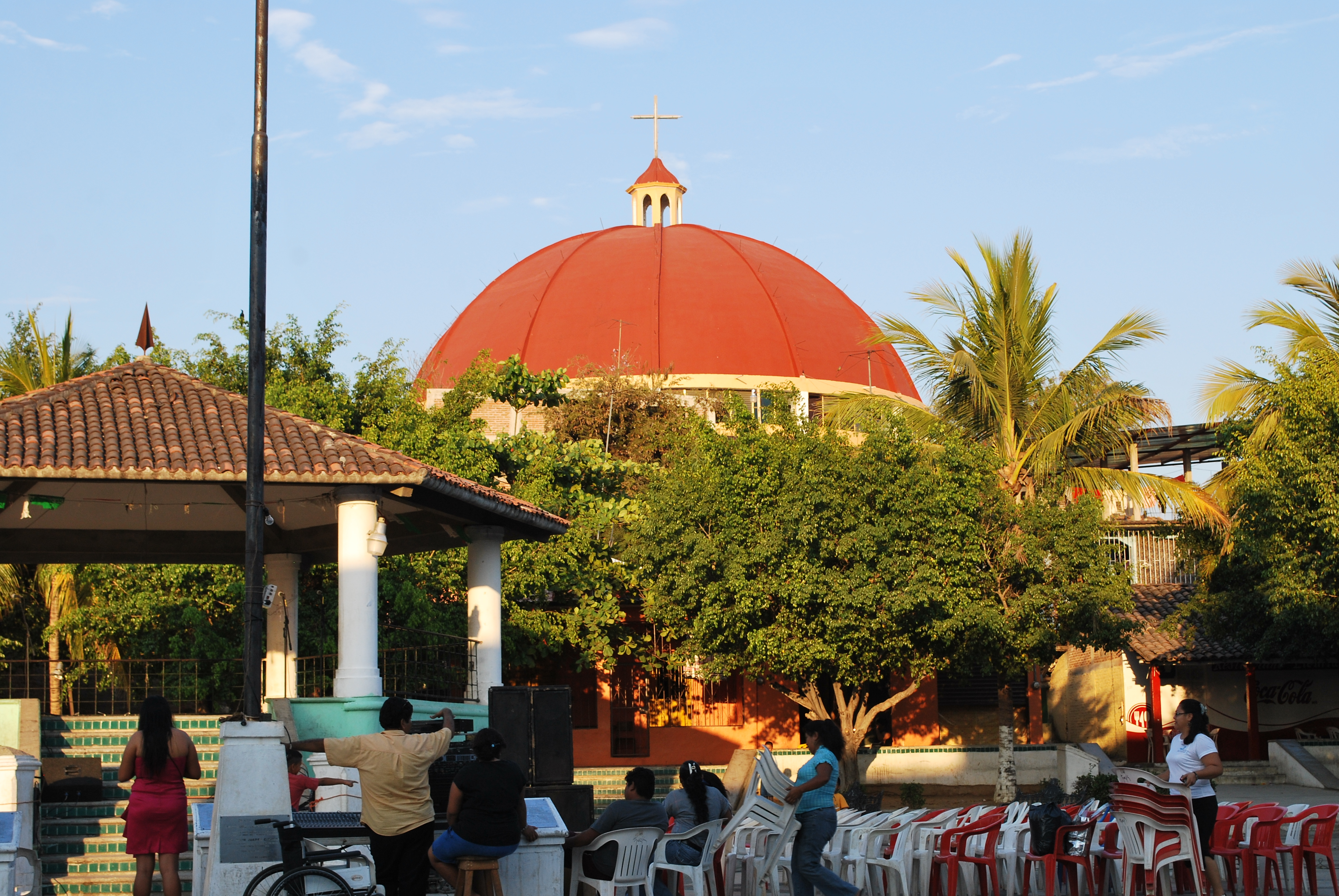
View of the main plaza with the dome of the Santa Cruz parish in the background in Cruz Grande, Guerrero.

Cruz Grande is a city and seat of the municipality of Florencio Villarreal, in the southern Mexican state of Guerrero.
