= San Marcos, Guerrero =

Town in the Mexican state of Guerrero

San Marcos
- Municipal seat
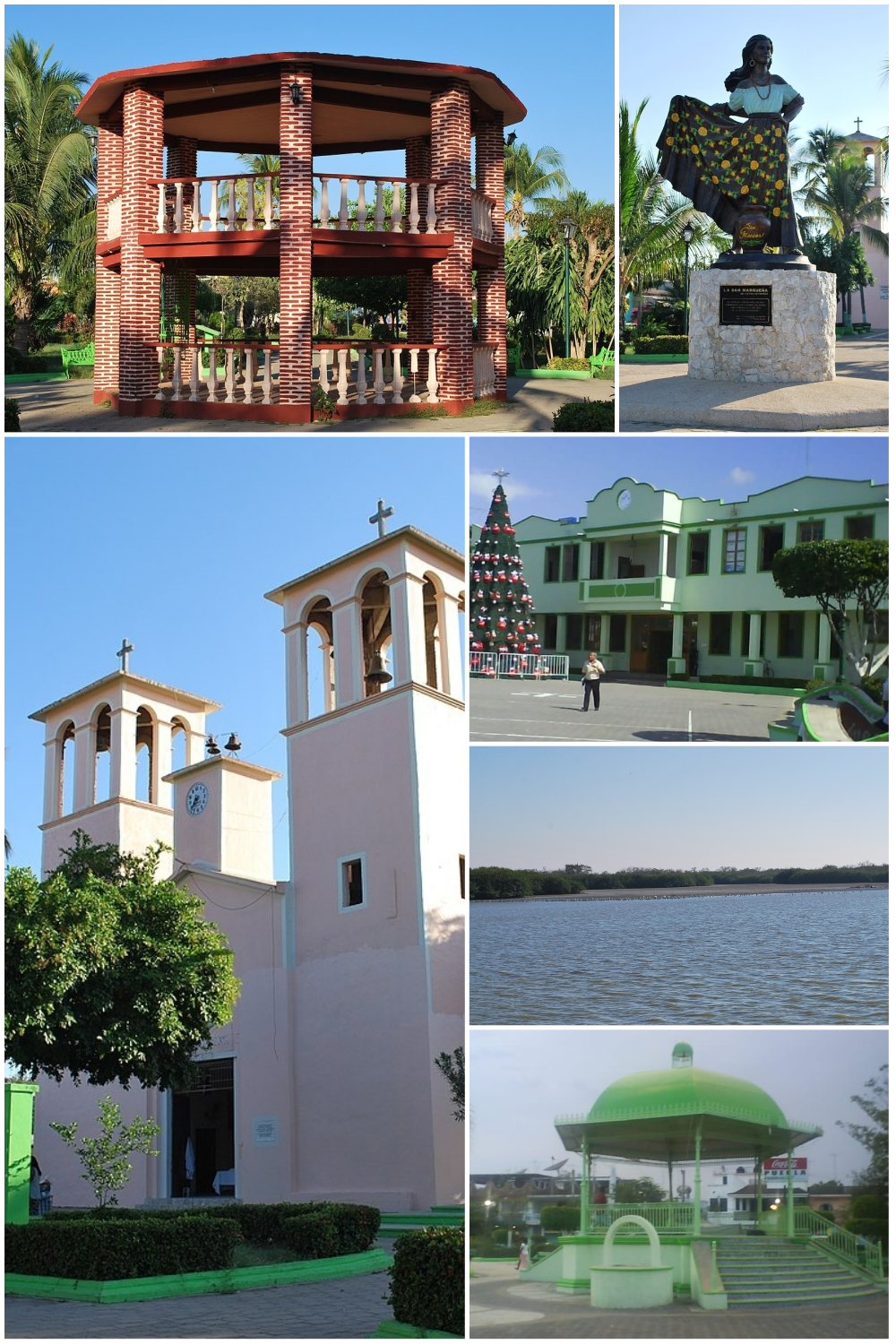

- Location in Mexico San Marcos (Mexico)
- Coordinates: 16°47′45″N 99°23′00″W
- Country: Mexico
- State: Guerrero
- Municipality: San Marcos
- Founded: 28 September 1885
- Elevation: 30 m (98 ft)

Population
  - Total: 12,000
- Time zone: UTC-6 (Central)

San Marcos is a town in the Mexican state of Guerrero. It serves as the municipal seat of the surrounding municipality of San Marcos.

The town currently has about 12 000 inhabitants.

Culturally and ethnically, the town and the municipality belong to what is known in Mexico as the Costa Chica (small coast) of Guerrero and Oaxaca. This is a 125 km long region along the Pacific coast; it begins south of Acapulco and ends near the town of Puerto Ángel in the neighbouring state of Oaxaca.

== Geography ==
The town is located approximately 59 km south of Acapulco. It is located 18 km inland and along Federal Highway 200, known locally as the Acapulco–Pinotepa Nacional highway. It is only about one hour's drive from Acapulco and about three hours (157 km) from Pinotepa Nacional.

== History ==
Officially, the town and municipality were established on 28 September 1885 and were named in honour of Saint Mark, a Catholic saint considered the patron saint of the region. However, the town already existed, firstly under the name of Xolutla and later La Estancia.
