= Brent =

Brent may refer to:

- Brent (name), an English given and surname

== Place name ==
In the United States

- Brent, Alabama
- Brent, Florida
- Brent, Georgia
- Brent, Missouri, a ghost town
- Brent, Oklahoma

In the United Kingdom

- Brent, Cornwall
- Brent Knoll, a hill in Somerset, England
- Brent Knoll (village), a village at the foot of the hill
- East Brent, another village at the foot of the hill
- London Borough of Brent, England
  - Brent (electoral division), Greater London Council
  - Brent tube station, former name of Brent Cross tube station, London, England
- South Brent, Devon, England

Elsewhere

- Brent, Ontario, a village in Algonquin Provincial Park, Canada
- Brent crater, a meteor crater named after the village of Brent, Ontario
- Brent oilfield, North Sea

== Other uses ==
- Brent Cross tube station, North-west London, England
- Brent Cross Shopping Centre, a mall in north London, close to the terminus to the M1 motorway
- Brent Crude, benchmark classification of oil
- Brent goose (Branta bernicla), known in North America as brant
- Brent International School, the Philippines
- Brent's method, a root-finding algorithm
- Brent railway station, South Devon, England
- Brent sidings, railway freight facility in north-west London, England
- Brent Spar, decommissioned oil storage and tanker loading buoy
- National Theatre of Brent, British comedy double-act
- River Brent, London, England
- Steam tug Brent (built 1946)

== See also ==
- Brentford, England, at the mouth of the River Brent
- Bret (disambiguation)
- Brett
