= Brett =

- Language: Old French, Breton, Norman French, English, Irish Gaelic

Origin
- Meaning: Ethnic name for a Breton person
- Region of origin: Ireland, England, Normandy, Brittany

Brett is an Irish and English surname of Norman origin. It derives from an Old French ethnic name denoting to a Breton person. Bretts arrived in both Ireland and England via their respective Norman conquests. Irish Bretts are most numerous in County Tipperary, County Waterford and County Sligo. Brett is de Breit in the Irish language.

The given name Brett derives from the surname and can be either masculine or feminine.

== People with the surname ==
- Adrian Brett (born 1945) English flutist and writer
- Agnes Baldwin Brett (1876–1955), American numismatist
- Bill Brett, Baron Brett (1942–2012), English politician and businessman
- Bob Brett (1953−2021), Australian tennis coach
- Brian Brett (speedway rider) (1938–2006), English speedway rider
- Brian Brett (1950–2024), Canadian writer
- Sir Charles Brett (1928–2005), Northern Irish lawyer
- Charles Brett (politician) (1715–1799), British politician
- Dorothy Brett (1883–1977), British-American painter
- Edwin Brett (1828–1895), British editor and publisher
- George Brett (born 1953), American baseball player, brother of Ken Brett
- George Brett (general) (1886–1963), American general
- George Wendell Brett (1912–2005), American philatelist
- Henry Brett (polo player) (born 1974), English polo player
- Jan Brett (born 1949), American children's writer
- James Seymour Brett (born 1974) English film composer
- Jasper Brett (1895–1917), Irish rugby player
- Jeremy Brett (1933–1995), British actor
- Jodie Brett (born 1996), English footballer
- John Brett (disambiguation)
- Judith Brett (born 1949), Australian academic and writer
- Ken Brett (1948–2003), American baseball player, brother of George Brett
- Laurie Brett (born 1970), British actress
- Lionel Brett, 4th Viscount Esher (1913–2004)
- Lloyd Milton Brett (1856–1927), American military officer
- Nick Brett (born 1974), English bowler
- Oliver Sylvain Baliol Brett, 3rd Viscount Esher (1881–1963)
- Paul Brett (1947–2024), British guitarist
- Peter V. Brett (born 1973), American writer of fantasy novels
- Philip Brett (1937–2002), American musicologist and conductor
- Philip Milledoler Brett (1871–1960), American lawyer and university president
- Raymond L. Brett (1917–1996), professor of English and a friend of Philip Larkin
- Reginald Brett, 2nd Viscount Esher (1852–1930), British politician
- Richard Brett (1567–1637), English scholar
- Robert Brett (1851–1929), Canadian politician
- Rosa Brett (1829–1882), British painter
- Ryan Brett (born 1991), baseball player
- Sammy Brett (1879–1939), English footballer
- Sarah Brett (born 1974), UK-based radio presenter
- Simon Brett (born 1945), British writer
- Stephen Brett (born 1985), New Zealand rugby player
- Sylvia Brett (1885–1971), Ranee of Sarawak
- Thomas Brett (cricketer) (1747–1809), English cricketer
- Thomas Brett (nonjuror) (1667–1743), English nonjuring clergyman
- Thomas Rutherford Brett (1931–2021), United States federal judge
- Tom Brett (born 1989), English cricketer
- William Brett, 1st Viscount Esher (1817–1899), British lawyer
- William de Brett (died 1247), Anglo-Norman knight and sheriff of Connacht in Ireland
- William Howard Brett (1846–1918), librarian
- William Howard Brett Jr. (1893–1989), director of the United States Mint from 1954 to 1961

== People with the given name ==
- Brett Anderson (disambiguation)
- Brett Madden (1978–2020), American voice actress, actress and producer
- Brett Baty (born 1999), American baseball player
- Brett Barker, American politician
- Brett Barnett (born 1992), English writer and director
- Brett Blundy (born 1959/1960), Australian billionaire businessman
- Brett Bolton (born 2006), American sledge hockey player
- Brett Boyko (born 1992), American football player
- Brett Butler (baseball) (born 1957), American baseball player
- Brett Butler (actress) (born 1958), American comedian and actress
- Brett Cooper (footballer) (born 1959), Australian rules footballer
- Brett Cooper (fighter) (born 1987), American mixed martial artist
- Brett Cooper (commentator) (born 2001), American political commentator, media personality, and actress
- Brett Dalton (born 1983), American actor
- Brett de Geus (born 1997), American baseball player
- Brett Doyle (born 1972), flat race jockey
- Brett Ekkens (born 1989), American football player and coach
- Brett Eldredge (born 1986), American country musician
- Brett Eskildsen (born 2005), American football player
- Brett Favre (born 1969), American football player
- Brett Gabbert (born 2000), American football player
- Brett Gardner (born 1983), American baseball player
- Brett Garner, American 21st century politician
- Brett Giannini, American politician
- Brett Giehl, American professional wrestler known as Dalton Castle
- Brett J. Gladman (born 1966), Canadian astronomer
- Brett Goldstein (born 1980), British actor, writer and comedian
- Brett Gurewitz (born 1962), guitarist and co-founder of the punk rock band Bad Religion
- Brett Hall, American politician
- Brett Harris (born 1998), American baseball player
- Brett Hull (born 1964), Canadian–American hockey player
- Brett Hundley (born 1993), American football player
- Brett James (born 1968), American singer, songwriter, and record producer
- Brett Kavanaugh (born 1965), American Supreme Court associate justice
- Brett Kerry (born 1999), American baseball player
- Brett Lauther (born 1990), Canadian football player
- Brett Lee (born 1976), Australian cricketer
- Brett Levis (born 1993), Canadian soccer player
- Brett Maher (gridiron football) (born 1989), American football punter and placekicker
- Brett Maher (basketball) (born 1973), Australian retired basketball player
- Brett Mauldin, American politician
- Brett Mitchell (born 1979), American conductor, composer, and pianist
- Brett Moffitt (born 1992), American NASCAR driver
- Brett Morris (born 1986), Australian rugby league player
- Brett Norfleet (born 2004), American football player
- Brett Prebble (born 1977), Australian jockey
- Brett Queener (born 1984), American lacrosse goaltender
- Brett Ratner, American film director and actor
- Brett Rice (born 1954), American actor
- Brett Rypien (born 1996), American football player
- Brett Salisbury (born 1968), American football player and writer
- Brett Sheehy (born 1958), Australian artistic director
- Brett Somers (1924–2007), Canadian-born American comedian and actress
- Brett Sterling (born 1984), American NHL ice hockey player
- Brett Stewart (born 1985), Australian rugby league player
- Brett Thomas (born 1959), American spree killer and rapist
- Brett Thorson (born 2000), Australian American football player
- Brett Toth (born 1996), American football player
- Brett Vroman (born 1955), American basketball player
- Brett Wheeler (born 1971), Australian basketball player
- Brett Whiteley (1939–1992), Australian artist
- Brett Wichrowski (born 2002), American baseball player
- Brett Wisely (born 1999), American baseball player
- Brett Yang (born 1992), Australian violinist and YouTuber
- Brett Yormark (born 1966), American college sports administrator
- Brett Young (Canadian football) (1967–2015), American player of Canadian football
- Brett Young (singer) (born 1981), American country singer

== Fictional characters ==
- Brett Ashley, in the Ernest Hemingway novel The Sun Also Rises
- Brett Craig, the long-suffering husband of Kim in Kath & Kim
- Brett Bunsen, in the 2009 animated series Archer
- Brett Graham, in the 1986 film Maximum Overdrive
- Brett Hand, in the 2021 series Inside Job
- Brett Hull, in the 2009 series Parks and Recreation
- Brett Kobashigawa, in the 2015 series Superstore
- Brett Maverick, professional poker player in the TV series Maverick
- Sergeant Brett Shelton, in the 1991 film Child's Play 3
- Lord Brett Sinclair, in the 1971 TV series The Persuaders!
- Jezaille Brett, in the video game The Great Ace Attorney: Adventures

== See also ==
- Bret (disambiguation)
  - Bret (given name)
  - Bret (surname)
