= Bret =

Bret or BRET may refer to:

- Bret (given name), including a list of people and fictional characters with the given name
- Bret (surname), including a list of people with the surname
- List of storms named Bret
- Background radiation equivalent time, a unit of measurement of ionizing radiation dosage
- Bioluminescence resonance energy transfer, a development of Förster resonance energy transfer

== See also ==
- Brett (disambiguation)
- Breton language
- Lac de Bret, a lake in Switzerland
- Bret v JS, a formative English contract law from 1600
