= Brett Cooper =

Brett Cooper may refer to:

- Brett Cooper (commentator) (born 2001), American political commentator
- Brett Cooper (fighter) (born 1987), American mixed martial artist
- Brett Cooper (footballer) (born 1959), Australian rules footballer

== See also ==
- Bret Cooper (born 1970), American football player
