= Tropical Storm Bret (2017) =

Atlantic tropical storm

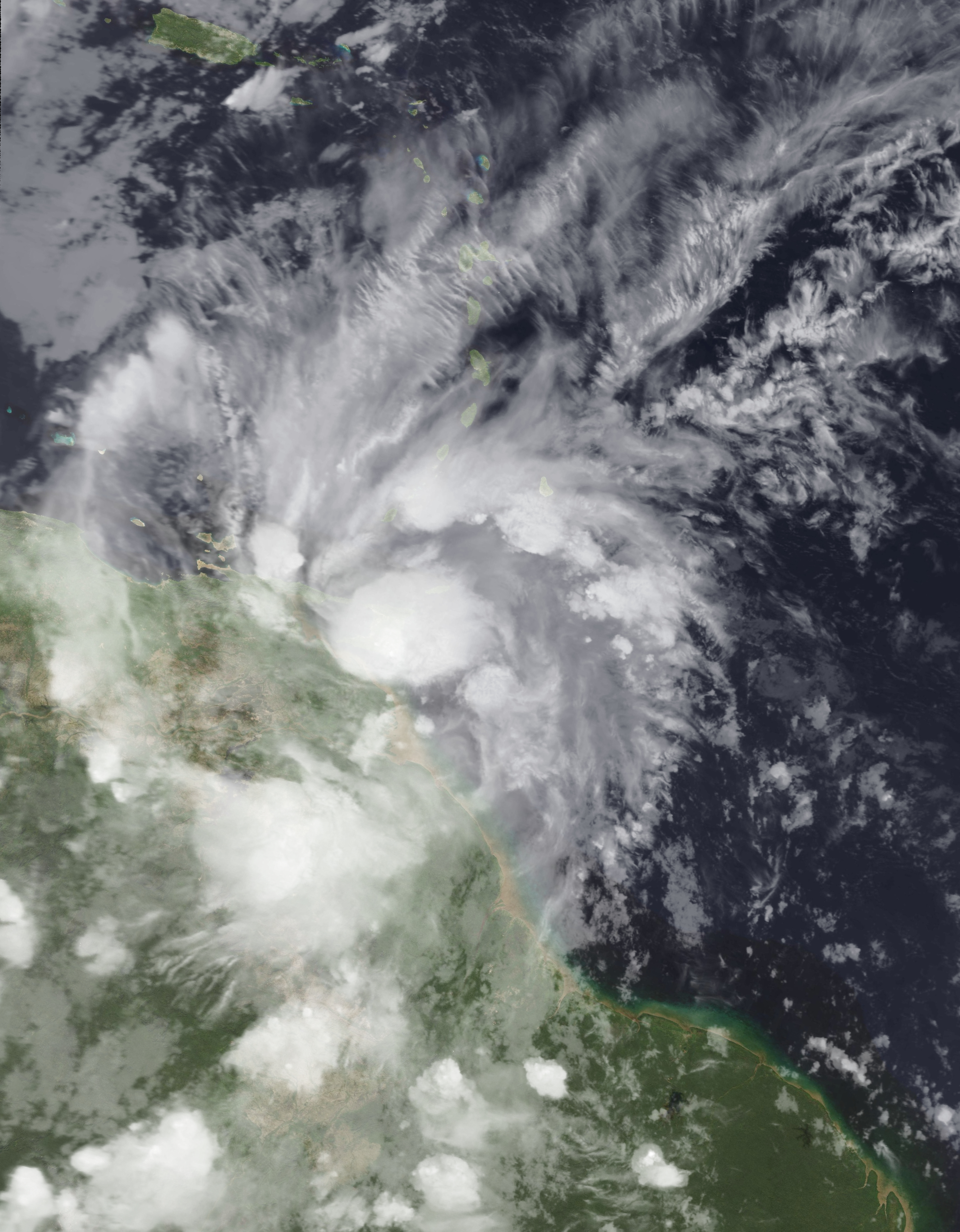
- Tropical Storm Bret shortly after making landfall in Trinidad on June 20

Meteorological history
- Formed: June 19, 2017
- Dissipated: June 20, 2017

Tropical storm
- 1-minute sustained (SSHWS/NWS)
- Highest winds: 50 mph (85 km/h)
- Lowest pressure: 1007 mbar (hPa); 29.74 inHg

Overall effects
- Fatalities: 1 direct, 1 indirect
- Damage: ≥$3 million (2017 USD)
- Areas affected: Trinidad and Tobago, Guyana, Venezuela, Windward Islands
- IBTrACS
- Part of the 2017 Atlantic hurricane season

Tropical Storm Bret was the earliest named storm in the calendar year to develop in the Main Development Region of the Atlantic basin on record. The second tropical cyclone of the 2017 Atlantic hurricane season, Bret formed from a tropical wave that had exited off the coast of West Africa on June 12. The disturbance moved swiftly across the Atlantic for several days, steadily organizing despite its low latitude. On June 18, the organization increased enough for the National Hurricane Center (NHC) to begin issuing warnings disturbance while it was located southeast of the Windward Islands. The system continued to organize, and by the next day, it had developed into a tropical storm, the second of the 2017 Atlantic hurricane season. Bret continued moving swiftly to the west and struck Trinidad and Tobago early on June 20, before entering the Caribbean Sea, dissipating shortly afterwards.

Starting in the 2017 season, the NHC changed its policy to allow tropical storm watches and warnings to be issued for tropical disturbances that do not yet satisfy the definition of a tropical cyclone but are expected to in short order while posing the threat of tropical-storm-force winds to landmasses. Thus, on June 18, although the vigorous tropical wave—the precursor to Bret—did not meet formal classification standards, the NHC began issuing advisories on what was considered a potential tropical cyclone. Bret left about $3 million (2017 USD) in damage and two deaths, (Note: All damage figures are in 2017 USD, unless otherwise noted) with both in Trinidad and Tobago.

== Meteorological history ==
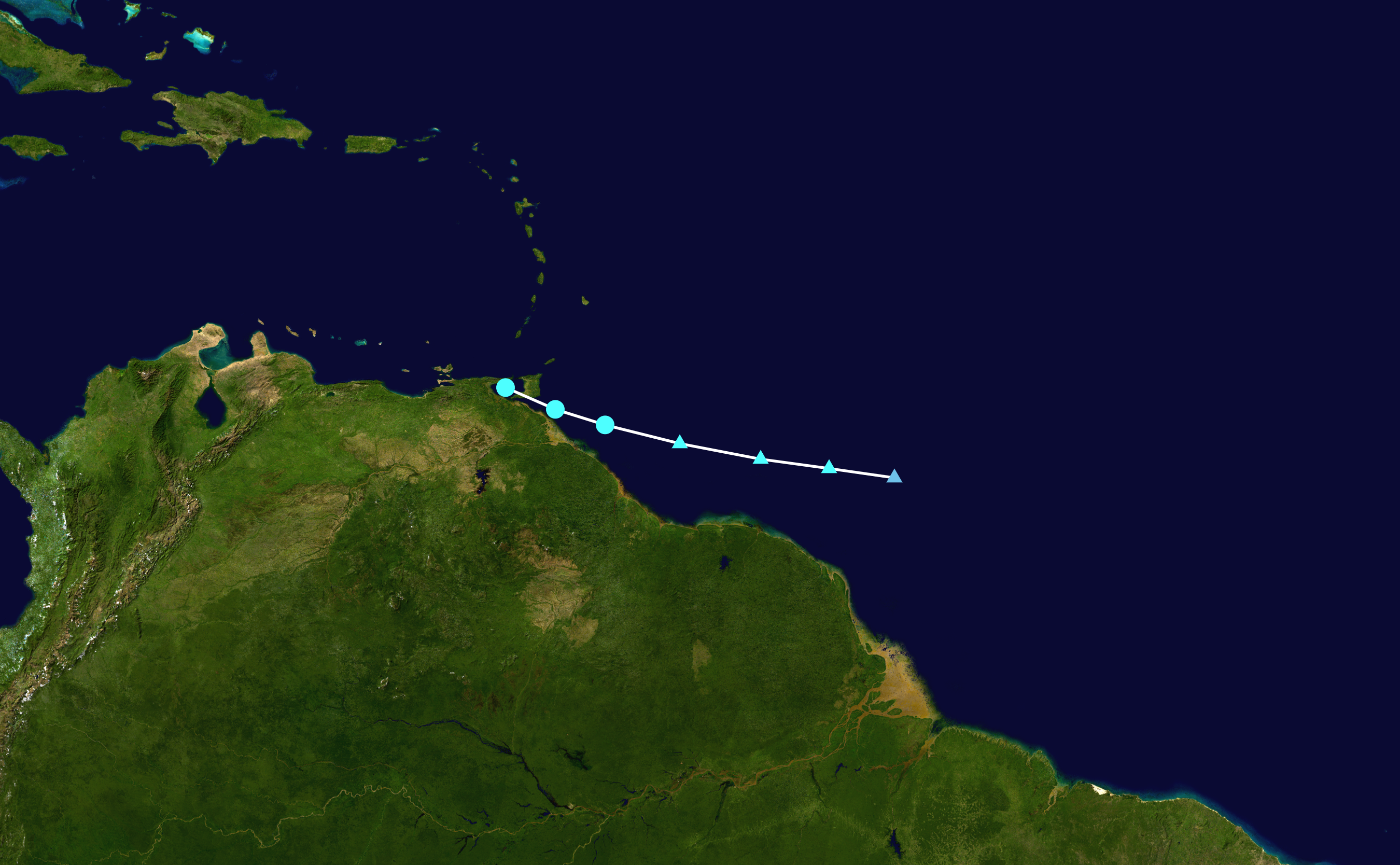
Map plotting the storm's track and intensity, according to the Saffir–Simpson scale Map key Saffir–Simpson scale Tropical depression (≤38 mph, ≤62 km/h) Tropical storm (39–73 mph, 63–118 km/h) Category 1 (74–95 mph, 119–153 km/h) Category 2 (96–110 mph, 154–177 km/h) Category 3 (111–129 mph, 178–208 km/h) Category 4 (130–156 mph, 209–251 km/h) Category 5 (≥157 mph, ≥252 km/h) Unknown Storm type Tropical cyclone Subtropical cyclone Extratropical cyclone, remnant low, tropical disturbance, or monsoon depression

A tropical wave emerged into the Atlantic from the west coast of Africa at a low-latitude on June 13. Although the wave was initially accompanied by a large area of showers and thunderstorms, convection diminished later the following day. The National Hurricane Center (NHC) began discussing the system in its Tropical Weather Outlooks (TWO) while the wave was located well south of Cabo Verde on June 14, though any organization was expected to be slow as the system tracked swiftly westward. Deep convection flared sporadically as the wave moved westward under the influence of a mid-level ridge situated to the north during the next few days. On June 16, cloudiness associated with the feature began to show signs of organization. ASCAT data around 12:00 UTC on June 18 indicated that a broad low pressure area developed, but lacked a well-defined circulation. A large area of 29 to 35 mph (47 to 56 km/h) winds was noted just north of the broad low. At 21:00 UTC, the NHC issued their first-ever advisory on a potential tropical cyclone. Despite winds of tropical storm-force, it was inconclusive whether the system possessed a closed low-level circulation.

Convection continued to increase on June 19, and around 18:00 UTC, a reconnaissance aircraft investigating the low found a well-defined center. As a result, the low became Tropical Storm Bret at this time, while situated about 185 mi (300 km) east-southeast of Trinidad. The NHC began advisories on Bret three hours later. Upon its formation, Bret became the earliest named storm on record in the Atlantic basin's main development region. Also upon developing, the cyclone attained its minimum barometric pressure of 1,007 mbar (29.7 inHg). Bret moved swiftly westward towards Trinidad and Tobago at speeds of nearly 30 mph (48 km/h), an unusually fast pace for a tropical cyclone, especially at such a low latitude. The storm was not expected to intensify significantly or last long due to increasing vertical wind shear and land interaction with Venezuela.

Early on June 20, a small central dense overcast formed near the center of Bret while satellite presentation improved. At 02:00 UTC, the system made landfall in southwestern Trinidad with winds of 50 mph (85 km/h), the storm's maximum sustained wind speed. After crossing the island, Bret emerged into the Gulf of Paria, before making another landfall on the Paria Peninsula of Venezuela at 09:00 UTC on June 20 at the same intensity. The effects of the hostile environment the cyclone was entering soon began to take its toll on the system, with the cloud pattern of the system becoming elongated. By 12:00 UTC, Bret was no longer a tropical cyclone as the circulation had dissipated. Operationally, the NHC continued advisories until 21:00 UTC, with the system located near Bonaire. Regeneration was not expected, but after crossing Central America and entering the eastern Pacific, the remnants of Bret contributed to the development of Hurricane Dora on June 26.

== Preparations, impact, and aftermath ==
=== Southeastern Caribbean ===
Infrared satellite loop of Bret making landfall in the island of Trinidad, early on June 20

On June 18, a tropical storm warning was raised for portions of the Windward Islands. This marked the first time a tropical storm warning was issued prior to becoming a tropical cyclone, following a change in NHC policy that enabled them to issue warnings on tropical disturbances if they posted a threat to land within 48 hours. These were expanded to include portions of Venezuela and the ABC islands the following afternoon. In anticipation of the storm, schools in Nueva Esparta suspended classes. Seafaring vessels were prohibited from leaving port.

=== Trinidad and Tobago ===
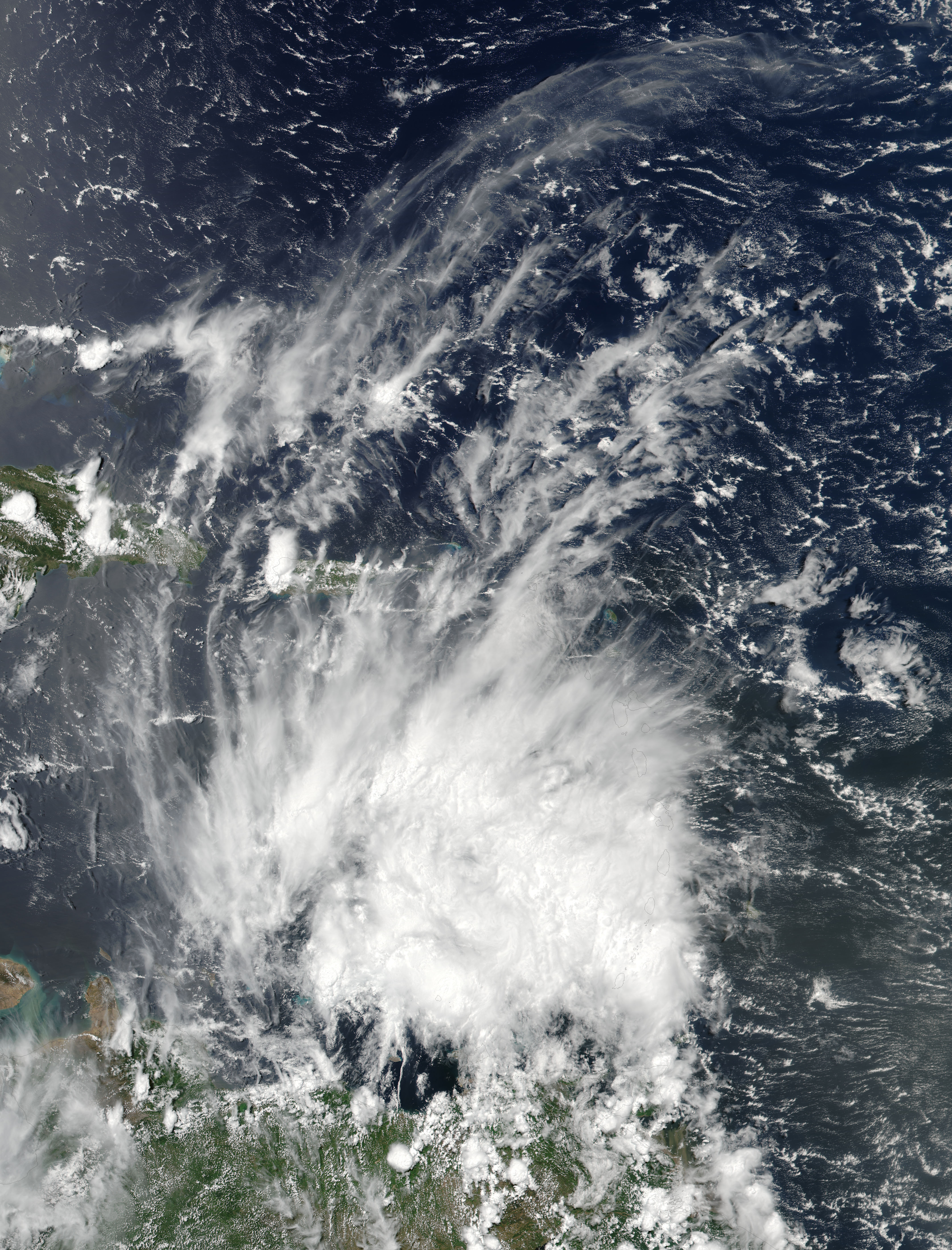
The remnants of Bret north of Venezuela, above the Leeward Antilles, late on June 20

In preparation for the storm, businesses across Trinidad and Tobago advised employees not involved in essential services to remain home, and schools were closed. Community centers, schools, and churches were transformed into emergency shelters, with 72 shelters opened on Tobago alone. Caribbean Airlines canceled its afternoon services, resulting in hundreds of stranded passengers. Meanwhile, the Port Authority of Trinidad and Tobago canceled all ferry services. The Health Ministries canceled all elective surgeries.

Trees were downed, roofs were blown off homes and businesses, and power lines were toppled as the storm approached the island. Heavy rainfall from Bret flooded portions of South Trunk Road in Mosquito Creek, Trinidad. Gusty winds also impacted Trinidad, with a gust of 66 km/h (41 mph) being observed at the Piarco International Airport, where 6.7 centimetres (2.6 in) of rainfall had also been recorded through the overnight hours of June 19–20. One man died in Trinidad after slipping off a makeshift bridge and hitting his head on June 20, which was slippery after rainfall from the tropical storm; thus it is classified as an indirect death. In Tobago, a man died of his injuries a week after his house collapsed on him during June 21. Damage from flooding in Barrackpore alone was reported to reach millions of dollars. Hundreds of homes were affected by flooding, with some inundated by 0.9 to 1.21 m (3.0 to 4.0 ft) of water. The medical records department of the Port-of-Spain General Hospital was temporarily closed after rainwater leaked into the structure. Five schools suffered damage, with two remaining closed a week after the storm. Total damage exceeded TT$20 million (US$3 million).

On June 24, four days after the passage of Bret, the chairman of the San Juan–Laventille Regional Corporation announced that residents, as well as farmers in Aranguez, would be receiving assistance through the region's relief fund beginning by the end of the current week. A TT$25 million (US$3.7 million) fund was established; however, this was later criticized as inadequate. Eventually, on June 30, the local government began to distribute approximately TT$10 million (US$1.48 million) in cheques to flood victims. A soup kitchen was opened for affected residents on July 1, and served approximately 500 bowls on its first day.

=== Venezuela ===
Heavy rainfall in Venezuela caused flooding along coastal areas of the country; schools were temporarily closed on Margarita Island. Winds in excess of 75 km/h (45 mph) uprooted trees and caused structural damage across Margarita Island. Two people suffered storm-related injuries when a wall collapsed. Rough seas sank boats and drove several onshore in Pampatar. Large mudslides damaged or destroyed many homes. Approximately 800 families were significantly affected in Miranda state, of whom 400 lost their homes. Across the country, 14,075 people were directly affected by the storm. In Nueva Esparta, the multipurpose ship Tango 94 was dispatched to provide relief materials to Margarita Island.

== See also ==
- Weather of 2017
- Tropical cyclones in 2017
- Other tropical cyclones named Bret
- 1933 Trinidad hurricane – a rare hurricane that moved through the Windward Islands and across the Caribbean in late June
- Tropical Storm Alma (1974) – similar storm that hit Trinidad in 1974
- Tropical Storm Isaac (1988) – took a similar track
- Tropical Storm Bret (1993) – similar storm with the same name that devastated Venezuela in early August
- Tropical Storm Earl (2004) – passed through similar areas as a moderate tropical storm in mid-August
- Tropical Storm Bret (2023) – took a similar track with the same name
