= Thomas Brett =

Thomas Brett may refer to:

- Thomas Brett (cricketer) (1747–1809), English cricketer
- Thomas Brett (nonjuror) (1667–1743), English nonjuring clergyman
- Thomas Rutherford Brett (1931–2021), United States federal judge
- Thomas Brett (MP for Hastings) (died 1568), MP for Hastings (UK Parliament constituency)
- Thomas Brett (MP for New Romney) (died 1638) for New Romney (UK Parliament constituency)
- Tom Brett (born 1989), English cricketer
- Tom Brett, character in B.F.'s Daughter
