= John Brett =

John Brett may refer to:

- John Brett (artist) (1831–1902), British artist associated with the Pre-Raphaelite movement
- John Brett (chronicler) (fl. 1556), English author of Brett's Narrative, about the Marian exiles
- John Brett (bishop) (died 1756), bishop of Elphin
- John Brett (Royal Navy officer) (died 1785), Royal Navy admiral
- John Brett (rugby union), English international rugby union player
- John Aloysius Brett (1879–1955), administrator in British India
- John Michael Brett, nom de plume of English author Miles Tripp (1923–2000)
- John Watkins Brett (1805–1863), English telegraphic engineer
- John Henry Brett (1835–1920), Irish architect, builder, and county surveyor

== See also ==
- Jack Brett (1917–1982), British motorcycle racer
