= Benito Jerónimo Feijóo y Montenegro =

Spanish monk and scholar (1676–1764)

Benito Jerónimo Feijóo
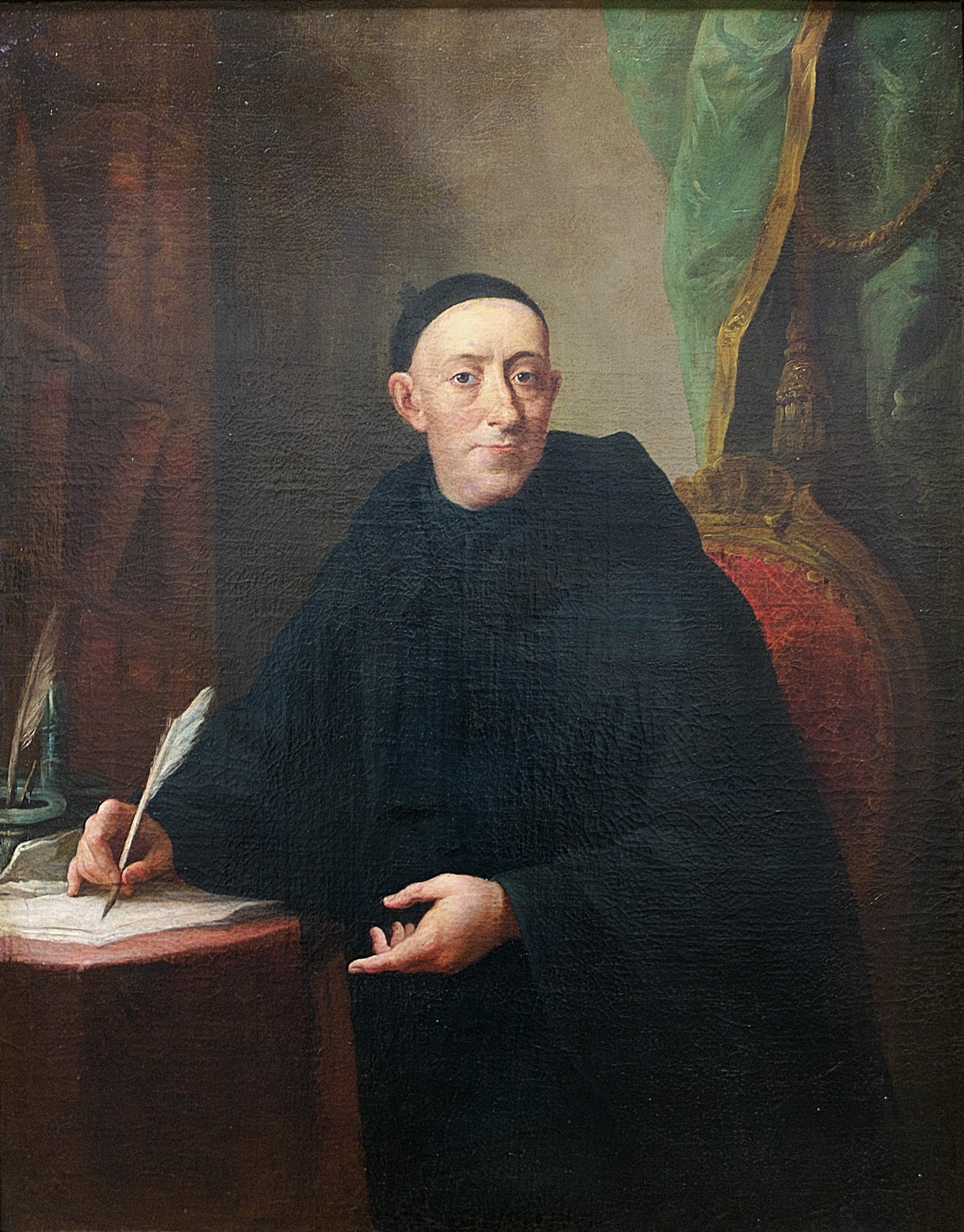
- Portrait of Feijóo y Montenegro by Mariano Salvador Maella
- Born: October 8, 1676; Santa María de Melias, near Ourense, Crown of Castile
- Died: September 26, 1764 (aged 89); Oviedo, Asturias, Spain
- Occupations: Monk, scholar, essayist

Friar Benito Jerónimo Feijóo y Montenegro (Spanish pronunciation: [beˈnito xeˈɾonimo fejˈxo(o) j monteˈneɣɾo]; 8 October 1676 – 26 September 1764) was a Spanish monk and scholar who led the Spanish Enlightenment. He was an energetic popularizer noted for encouraging scientific and empirical thought in an effort to debunk myths and superstitions.

== Biography ==
He joined the Benedictine order at the age of 12, and had taken classes in Galicia, León, and Salamanca. He later taught theology and philosophy at the University, where he earned a professorship in theology.

He was appalled by the superstition and ignorance of his time, and his works aimed at combating the situation. His fame spread quickly throughout Europe. His revelations excited considerable opposition in certain quarters in Spain, for example from Salvador José Mañer and others; but the opposition was futile, and Feijóo's services to the cause of education and knowledge were universally recognized long before his death in Oviedo.

A century later Alberto Lista said that a monument should be erected to Feijóo, at the foot of which all his works should be burned. He was not a great genius, nor a writer of transcendent merit; his name is connected with no important discovery, but his literary style is clear and not without distinction. He tried to uproot many popular errors, awakened an interest in scientific methods, and is justly regarded as the initiator of educational reform in Spain.

== Works ==
His two famous works, Teatro crítico universal (1726–1739) and Cartas eruditas y curiosas (1742–1760), are multi-volume collections of essays that cover a range of subjects, from natural history and the then known sciences, education, history, religion, literature, philology, philosophy and medicine, down to superstitions, wonders and salient points of contemporary journalistic interest. In the edition of 1777 they occupy nine and five volumes respectively, to which three supplementary volumes must be added. A reprint occurs in volume 56 of the Biblioteca de autores españoles, with an introduction by Vicente de la Fuente. As learning advanced, his writings were relatively relegated to a place of historical and literary interest. A small portion of his works were translated into English by Captain John Brett (3 vols., 1777-1780).
