= Brett (disambiguation) =

Brett is a given name and surname.

Brett may also refer to:

- River Brett, in Suffolk, England
- Brettanomyces, a genus of yeast
- The Dance Party, an American pop rock band, which was temporarily named Brett

== See also ==
- Bret (disambiguation)
