= Bret (surname) =

Bret is a surname. Notable people with the surname include:

- Antoine Bret (1717–1792), French writer and playwright
- David Bret (born 1954), French-born British author of biographies
- Jean Jacques Bret (1781–1819), French mathematician
- Patrice Bret (ski mountaineer) (born 1971), French ski mountaineer
- Patrice Bret (historian) (born 1949), French historian of science and technology

== See also ==
- Lebret (disambiguation)
