= TID-class tug =

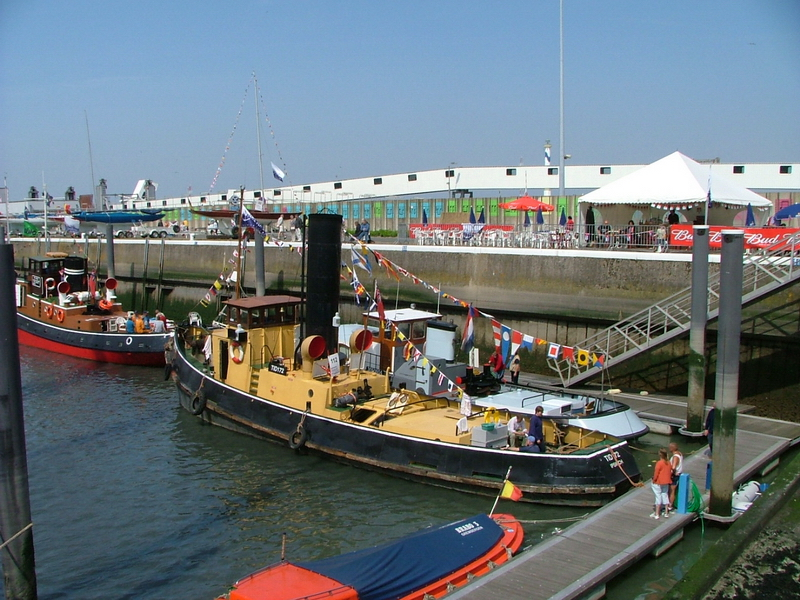
- TID 172 at Ostend

Class overview
- Name: Tug, Inshore and Dock
- Builders: assembly and fitting out by Richard Dunston Ltd., (Thorne and Hessle), William Pickersgill & Sons Ltd., Southwick, Sunderland.
- Operators: Ministry of War Transport
- Completed: 182
- Active: 4 Steam

General characteristics
- Type: tug boat
- Displacement: 124 long tons
- Length: 65 ft
- Beam: 17 ft
- Draught: 7 ft 4 in
- Depth: 8 ft
- Installed power: 220 ihp reciprocating steam engine
- Propulsion: single screw
- Speed: 8 knots
- Capacity: 2 ton Bollard Pull

TID was a standardized British design for a tugboat drawn up and built during the Second World War. One hundred and eighty two (TID-1 to TID-12 and TID-14 to TID-183) were built for the Ministry of War Transport.

== Manufacture ==
Richard Dunston Ltd., a shipbuilding company with yards at Thorne on the Stainforth and Keadby Canal and at Hessle on the Humber, had pioneered the use of welded construction, rather than the more conventional rivetting, since 1933, although they had never built an all-welded vessel. An order for 12 tugs in 1942 was the opportunity to try such a design. They designed the hulls so that they could be made up from eight separate sections, which were fabricated by manufacturers with spare welding capacity. Shipbuilders with spare capacity were in short supply at the time, but other non-shipbuilding industry was available. Each of the sections was a maximum of 10 feet (3.0 m) by 17 feet (5.2 m) by 13 feet (4.0 m), and weighed less than 6 tons, so that they could be transported by road to the Thorne yard. At the yard, the sections were fitted together by welders, many of whom were women, and the engines were installed. The first tug was ready for despatch in February 1943, and for more than a year, one left the yard every five days.

The first 90 tugs built were fitted with coal-fired boiler, while subsequent ones were oil-fired. Dunston's built a total of 159 TID tugs, of which 152 were built at Thorne and seven at Hessle. These were supplemented by 23 which were built at the yard of William Pickersgill & Co., of Sunderland. Several of the oil-fired tugs were shipped to the Far East as deck cargo on larger vessels.

As designed they were 65 feet (20 m) long by 17 feet (5.2 m) in the beam by 8 feet (2.4 m) deep, measuring 54 GRT. Draught when laden was 7 feet 4 inches (2.24 m) - a displacement of 124 tons. Propulsion was a 220 ihp 2 cylinder reciprocating steam engine driving a single screw. Steam was from coal or later oil - the change being to allow use in the Far East. They were capable of around 8 knots.

== Gallery ==
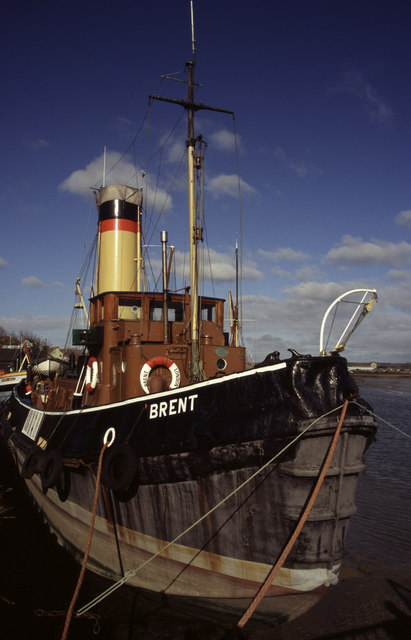
TID 159 renamed as Brent and moored at Maldon in 2005

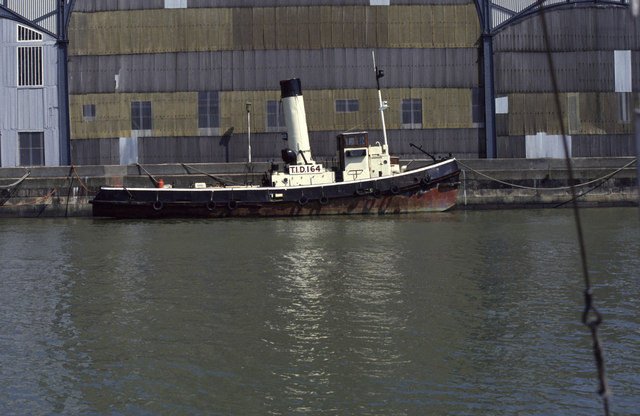
TID 164 at Chatham Historic Dockyard in 1994

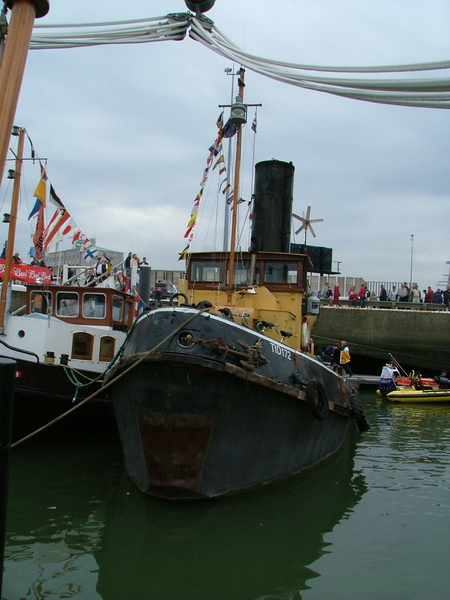
TID 172 at Ostend

== See also ==
- CHANT (ship type) - a standardized coastal tanker

== Bibliography ==
- Taylor, Mike (2009). Richard Dunston Limited of Thorne & Hessle. Barnsley: Pen and Sword Books. ISBN 978-1-84563-094-2.
- MMT. "The TID Story". Medway Maritime Trust.
- "The TID Story - Page 2". Medway Maritime Trust.
