= Tropical Storm Bret (1993) =

Atlantic tropical storm in 1993

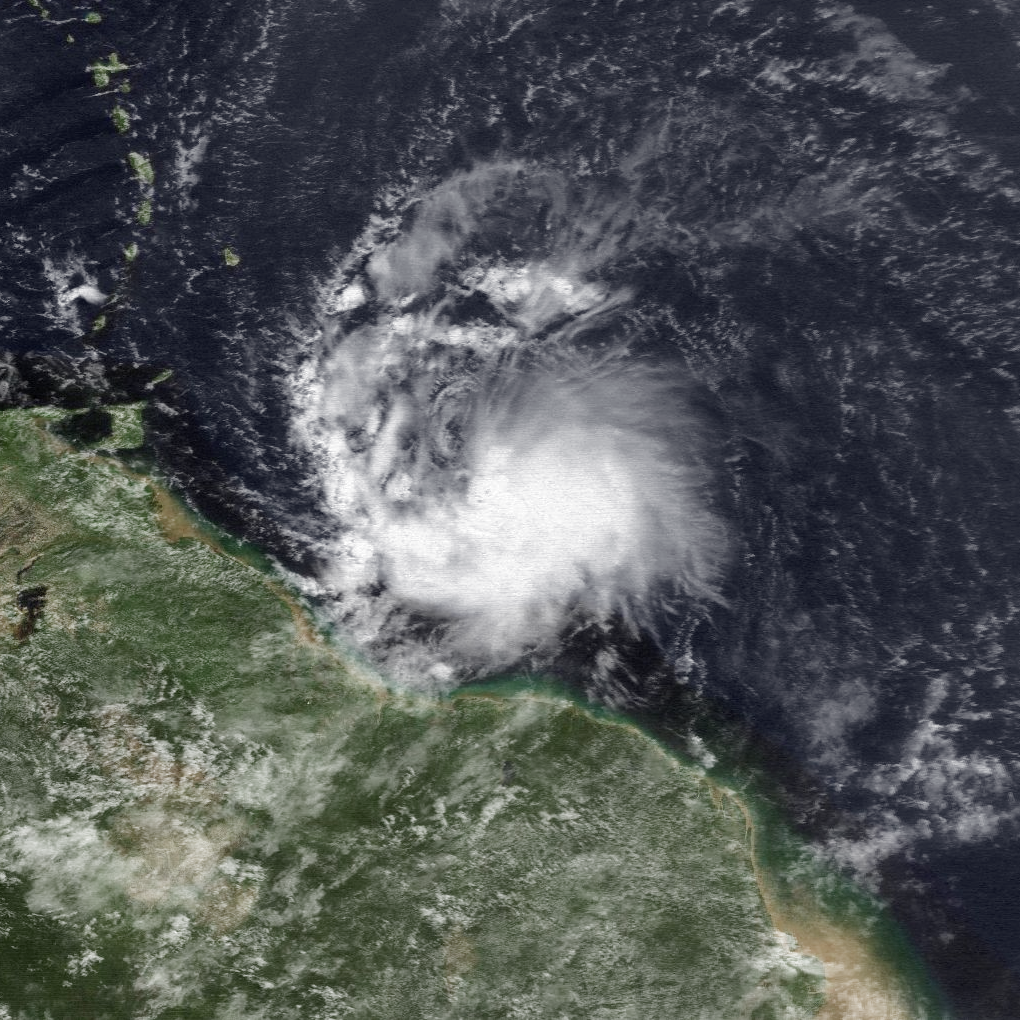
- Tropical Storm Bret shortly after peak intensity on August 6

Meteorological history
- Formed: August 4, 1993
- Dissipated: August 11, 1993

Tropical storm
- 1-minute sustained (SSHWS/NWS)
- Highest winds: 60 mph (95 km/h)
- Lowest pressure: 1002 mbar (hPa); 29.59 inHg

Overall effects
- Fatalities: 213 total
- Damage: $35.7 million (1993 USD)
- Areas affected: Windward Islands, Venezuela, Colombia, Costa Rica, Nicaragua
- IBTrACS
- Part of the 1993 Atlantic hurricane season

Tropical Storm Bret was the deadliest natural disaster in Venezuela since the 1967 Caracas earthquake. The third tropical cyclone of the 1993 Atlantic hurricane season, Bret formed on August 4 from a westward-moving, African tropical wave. Bret would later peak as a 60 mph (97 km/h) tropical storm as it neared Trinidad. It took an extremely southerly course through the Caribbean, passing over the coasts of Venezuela and Colombia. High terrain in the northern parts of those countries severely disrupted the circulation of the storm, and Bret had weakened to a tropical depression before emerging over the extreme southwestern Caribbean Sea. There, it restrengthened to a tropical storm and made landfall in Nicaragua on August 10, dissipating soon after. Bret's remnants reached the Pacific Ocean, where they would later regenerate into Hurricane Greg.

Though Bret was only a weak tropical storm at landfall, it caused extreme flooding and nearly 200 deaths as it moved through South America, mostly in Venezuela. The first tropical storm to strike the country in 100 years, Bret deluged northern regions with 13.35 in (339 mm) of rainfall. The capital, Caracas, received 4.72 in (120 mm) of rain over seven hours, resulting in widespread mudslides in the hills around the city that buried houses and carried away cars. There were 173 deaths in the country, and damage was estimated at US$25 million (1993 USD). (Note: All damage totals are in 1993 values of their respective currencies.) Volunteers and firefighters helped storm victims cope with the damage, while workers cleared roads to restore transportation.

Outside of Venezuela, Bret first affected Trinidad and Tobago, causing minor flooding and power outages. It passed just south of Curaçao, where the storm damaged the coral reef and the roofs of 17 homes. The storm later brushed northern Colombia, killing one person there, before hitting Central America. In Nicaragua, Bret killed 31 people and left US$3 million in damage, with many coastal towns isolated by floods. There was one death in neighboring Costa Rica and seven in Honduras, all due to flooding. In Central America, damage would be compounded by Hurricane Gert as it traversed the region in early September.

== Meteorological history ==
Map plotting the storm's track and intensity, according to the Saffir–Simpson scale Map key Saffir–Simpson scale Tropical depression (≤38 mph, ≤62 km/h) Tropical storm (39–73 mph, 63–118 km/h) Category 1 (74–95 mph, 119–153 km/h) Category 2 (96–110 mph, 154–177 km/h) Category 3 (111–129 mph, 178–208 km/h) Category 4 (130–156 mph, 209–251 km/h) Category 5 (≥157 mph, ≥252 km/h) Unknown Storm type Tropical cyclone Subtropical cyclone Extratropical cyclone, remnant low, tropical disturbance, or monsoon depression

Tropical Storm Bret originated from a tropical wave—a westward-tracking low-pressure area—that crossed the coast of Africa on August 1, 1993. Throughout its journey across the open Atlantic, the wave retained an impressive cloud structure with an area of deep convection. By August 4, the associated thunderstorm activity consolidated and organized into curved rainbands. The National Hurricane Center (NHC), noting the improving structure and sufficient support from Dvorak intensity estimates, reassessed the wave as a tropical depression at 12:00 UTC that day, the third such system of the annual hurricane season. At the time of its classification, it was located along the 10th parallel north over the central Atlantic, about 1,150 mi (1,850 km) west-southwest of the Cape Verde Islands.

With a very resilient high-pressure area to its north, the depression continued moving due west at an unusually low latitude for most of its existence. The system gradually organized due to low wind shear. After the outflow increased and the circulation became better established, the NHC upgraded the depression to Tropical Storm Bret early on August 5. Initially, the agency expected the storm would attain hurricane status while moving west-northwestward through the Caribbean Sea, although the storm would maintain its westward track. Early on August 6, Bret attained peak winds of 60 mph (97 km/h), fueled by warm waters and increased banding around a central dense overcast. The circulation became exposed late on August 6, but the thunderstorms soon refired over the center. At 07:00 UTC on the next day, Bret struck the island of Trinidad near Galera Point. The storm moved across the northern portion of the island, and later made landfall in northeastern Venezuela near Macuro.

After hitting northeastern Venezuela, Bret continued westward through the extreme northern portion of the country. Around 20:00 UTC on August 7, the circulation emerged into the southeastern Caribbean Sea. The circulation weakened and became poorly defined, although the storm maintained stronger winds to the north. Despite the southerly inflow being disrupted by the mountainous terrain, Bret maintained its circulation while continuing westward, passing just north of Venezuela's capital Caracas. Around 08:00 UTC on August 8, the storm moved back onshore Venezuela near Morrocoy National Park in Falcón state. Later that day, the NHC noted that there was "little if any circulation left to this system", although the agency continued issuing advisory due to the storm's heavy rainfall. However, a circulation emerged into the Gulf of Venezuela, which soon crossed into northeastern Colombia. There, the circulation neared the Pico Cristóbal Colón, the tallest mountain in Colombia with a peak of 18,947 ft (5,775 m). This caused the structure to deteriorate, and on August 9 Bret weakened to tropical depression status with the circulation "practically dissipated", according to the NHC. The Hurricane Hunters had difficulty finding a closed circulation, prompting the NHC to discontinue advisories at 15:00 UTC on August 9.

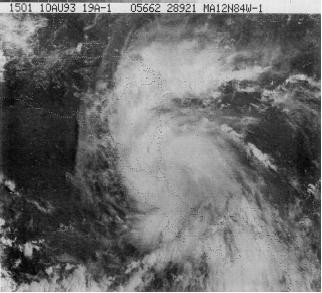
Bret making landfall on Nicaragua

After moving through the southwestern Caribbean Sea, Bret began to re-develop convection as upper-level conditions became more favorable. By early on August 10, surface observations confirmed the presence of a low-level circulation, and the NHC re-issued advisories on the system. The convection continued to organize, prompting the NHC to upgrade Bret again to a tropical storm. The storm strengthened slightly further to a secondary peak of 45 mph (72 km/h). Around 17:00 UTC on August 10, Bret made its final landfall in southern Nicaragua near Bahia Punta Gorda. The circulation moved through the country and turned more to the west-northwest. Operationally, it was believed that Bret survived after crossing Central America and entered the eastern Pacific, as the NHC designated it Tropical Depression Eight-E. Post-storm analysis determined otherwise that Bret dissipated over western Nicaragua, near the Pacific coast on August 11. The remnants continued to the west-northwest, eventually developing into a tropical depression on August 15 off the west coast of Mexico. The system eventually became Hurricane Greg with peak winds of 130 mph (210 km/h), which lasted until August 28.

== Preparations ==
In general, Bret was forecast to track farther north than it ultimately did. About 24 hours in advance of the storm, tropical cyclone warnings and watches were issued for the southern Lesser Antilles and Venezuela. The first tropical storm watch was posted late on August 5 from Dominica southward to Trinidad. On the next day, this was upgraded to a tropical storm warning and hurricane watch from Saint Lucia to Trinidad. Tropical storm warnings spread westward through Venezuela along the storm's path, as well as the ABC islands and northern Colombia along the Guajira Peninsula. Later when Bret began reorganizing in the southwestern Caribbean, portions of Nicaragua were under a tropical storm warning only nine hours before the storm struck. The warning covered from Puerto Cabezas, Nicaragua through the entirety of the Costa Rican coastline, as well as San Andrés island offshore.

In Trinidad and Tobago, the government set up shelters and sent home non-essential oil workers. Officials canceled flights and shut the ports as a precaution. Stores and business closed early after locals had stocked up on life supplies. Army troops were deployed in Port of Spain to avert looting. The threat of the storm caused a rise in unleaded oil prices. In Venezuela, boats were ordered to remain at port, while flights were canceled to Isla Margarita and Puerto la Cruz. Rescue workers were mobilized in the capital city of Caracas to prepare in the event of landslides. Ahead of the storm, the head of Sucre state declared a state of emergency, and later Caracas was placed under the same state once the rains began. According to the governor of Venezuela's capital district, local weather media expected the storm to only brush Caracas and surrounding areas; as a result, not all precautions were made. On August 7, weather officials stated that the brunt of the storm had passed and that the storm was weakening; this was before the onslaught of the flooding rains. In neighboring Colombia, officials issued a wind and heavy rain warning in response to the storm. Towns shut off electricity along the coast and canceled flights. Later, about 1,000 people evacuated from eastern Costa Rica, and another 40,000 evacuated from portions of Nicaragua, Flights in the country were canceled due to the storm.

== Impact ==
Death tolls by country
Country	Deaths
Venezuela	173
Nicaragua	31
Honduras	7
Colombia	1
Costa Rica	1
Total	213

=== Southern Caribbean ===
The storm first struck northern Trinidad, producing peak wind gusts of 27 mph (44 km/h) and 4.4 in (111 mm) of rainfall. The winds knocked down trees while the rains caused flooding, resulting in power outages, which affected 35,000 people. The power cable connecting Trinidad with Tobago was cut during the storm, leaving the latter island briefly without power. Ten soldiers were burned while attempting to move a downed wire in Tobago. The storm damaged houses on southern Trinidad and central Tobago. Meanwhile, flood waters devastated local crops, resulting in losses of more than TT$4 million (US$730,000). Infrastructure damage due to inaccessible roads and bridges totaled TT$979,000 (US$179,000). On nearby Grenada, a weather station reported sustained winds of 37 mph (60 km/h), with gusts to 45 mph (72 km/h). A ship known as the Lady Elaine, reported winds of 45 mph (72 km/h), while anchored at Hog Island on the south coast of Grenada.

Passing 70 mi (110 km) to the south, Bret brushed Curaçao with tropical-storm-force winds and light precipitation. A peak wind of 48 mph (77 km/h) was recorded at a local weather station, though strong onshore breeze averaged 30 to 35 mph (48 to 56 km/h). The storm damaged the roofs of 17 homes and caused power outages to the island. Rough surf, with wave heights of 4.9 ft (1.5 m), severely disrupted the coral reef along the south shore, breaking off 25–50% of the reef's branches. In particular, elkhorn (Acropora palmata) and fire coral (Millepora complanata) received extensive damage to their structures. Of the coral reefs, those in shallow waters were worst affected; considerable damage also occurred to pillar coral (Dendrogyra cylindrus), which typically grow at depths of less than 16 ft (4.9 m) below water. The animals and plants there were affected as well. In addition, nearby Bonaire experienced gusts to gale force during the passage of the storm.

As a minimal tropical storm, Bret moved through northern Colombia. The storm downed a power line onto a house in the city of Maicao, killing one person and injuring another. An oil tanker rode out the storm at Coveñas port, with no effects to it or the nation's oil industry.

=== Venezuela ===
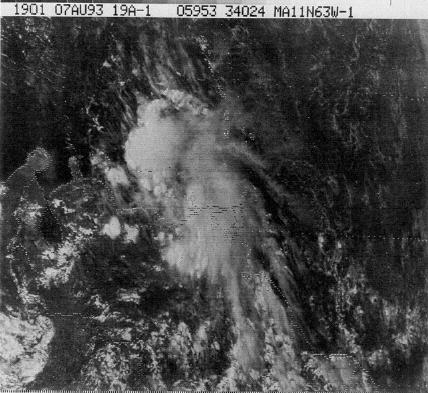
Satellite image of Bret over Venezuela

Striking eastern Venezuela, Bret produced wind gusts of 44 mph (71 km/h) in Guiria, near where the storm moved ashore. Isla Margarita offshore reported wind gusts of 53 mph (85 km/h), as well as high waves 66 ft (20 m) in height. The capital city Caracas recorded wind gusts of around 31 to 37 mph (50 to 60 km/h); according to news reports, Bret was the first tropical storm to affect Caracas in 100 years. However, the storm's rainfall was more significant. Guanare in western Venezuela reported 13.35 in (339 mm) of rainfall in just 10 hours. Quebrada Seca in Barinas state recorded 11.23 in (285 mm) of rainfall over 24 hours, and in the capital Caracas, 4.72 in (120 mm) of rainfall occurred over just seven hours. The capital ultimately was affected by 10 hours of heavy rainfall. One station in the country recorded 5 in (130 mm) of precipitation in seven hours, setting a nationwide record for the 20th century for the heaviest rainfall over that duration.

The heavy rainfall was the most destructive aspect of Tropical Storm Bret in Venezuela. On the offshore Isla Margaria, the rains flooded the primary hospital, and rivers overflowed, although damage was minimal. On the mainland, heavy rainfall caused damaging mudslides and flooding, and entire houses buried in the middle of the night with little notice. Flooded rivers washed away cars and homes in the hills of Caracas, mostly along the flooded La Guarre River. Floodwaters mixed with raw sewage from damaged water lines across the region. Residents returned to damaged homes despite warnings. Damage was worst in Petare, La Vega, and El Valle, all surrounding Caracas on insecure mountainsides. One home was wrecked in Petare, killing four family members. At least 19 people perished in Miranda state, and another three deaths were reported in Aragua due to landslides. Residents requested assistance from the local fire company, although disrupted telephone service created an atmosphere of confusion. Strong winds also destroyed the roofs of other houses, and areas were left without power. Portions of the Pan-American Highway and a coastal road were disrupted by landslides, and the state of Barinas was largely isolated due to road blockages. Most roads west of Caracas were likewise blocked.

Overall, Tropical Storm Bret left over 11,000 people homeless, including 6,000 in Barinas state, and 3,500 in Caracas. Bret left US$25 million in damage and caused 173 deaths in the country, while at least 500 were injured. Most of the deceased were living in poorly built homes around Caracas, where at least 120 people were killed, mainly children. The storm was the deadliest natural disaster in Venezuela since the 1967 Caracas earthquake.

=== Central America ===
Upon making landfall in Nicaragua, Bret caused severe flooding along the coast that left 25 villages isolated. Rains continued following the storm, preventing areas from being reached, and Tropical Storm Gert brought additional rainfall to the area in early September. Throughout Nicaragua, Bret destroyed 12 bridges and disrupted the drainage systems along the regional road network. Heavy rainfall also caused rivers to overflow, causing heavy damage in adjacent fields that affected rice, cassava, and bananas; about 1,800 hectares (4,400 acres) of rice fields were destroyed. Two villages of the Miskito people were washed away, leaving 500 residents homeless. The storm damaged at least 1,500 houses and destroyed another 850, leaving around 60,000 people temporarily homeless. Bret also destroyed ten churches and ten schools, as well as 25 medical centers. The storm killed nine people offshore when a boat sank in the Corn Islands, and there were 31 deaths overall in the country. The preliminary damage total was around US$3 million, although it did not include crop or infrastructure damage.

The storm brought heavy rainfall and high seas to the east coast of Costa Rica, as well as gusty winds. One death occurred in the country, as well as US$7.7 million in damage. Similarly heavy rain fell in the Mosquitia region of Honduras. Floodwaters reached 7 ft (2.1 m) deep, isolating coastal towns. Overflown rivers and flooding forced about 1,700 people to evacuate by canoe, while some residents rode out the storm on the roofs of their homes. About 16,000 people were left homeless. The storm destroyed over 2,000 hectares (4,900 acres) of various crops, and there were seven deaths in the country. In El Salvador, light winds were also experienced, with moderate rainfall reaching 4.1 in (104 mm) in La Palma, Chalatenango. The storm knocked down trees near the capital San Salvador, temporarily leaving the city without power.

== Aftermath ==
Venezuela's then-president Ramón José Velásquez held an emergency meeting to respond to the Bret's heavy damage. The president conveyed three days of national mourning due to the storm. About 1,400 workers and volunteers helped in rescue efforts after the mudslides struck Caracas and surrounding areas, assisted by Red Cross volunteers and 800 firefighters. Volunteers provided water and medicine to the affected, while workers emptied residual pools of water to mitigate the spread of disease. Storm victims were temporarily housed at the Fuerte Tiuna army base. Roads were quickly cleared of debris and mud, although many were not reopened initially due to the threat for additional mudslides. Within a week of the storm's passage, telephone service was largely repaired in Caracas and airline travel was restored. After the storm, the United Nations Development Programme (UNDP) provided US$50,000 in emergency spending, and UNICEF sent US$15,000 to buy oral rehydration salts. A Venezuelan radio station held a marathon to collect relief items, such as food or clothing.

After the storm, the Nicaraguan government declared a state of disaster in the North and South Caribbean Coast Autonomous Regions, as well as Tisma in the Masaya Department. The government sheltered those made homeless in Bluefields along the Atlantic coast. Relief efforts were coordinated by the Comité Nacional de Emergencia to provide aid to the affected storm victims. Officials sent medical crews to the hardest hit areas. This was due to an increased potential for the spread of water-born diseases, the result of ongoing floods and damaged sanitation facilities. Meanwhile, planes flew overhead to determine the extent of damage. On August 18, the government requested international assistance to cope from the disaster. In response, the United Nations Office for the Coordination of Humanitarian Affairs and the UNDP sent US$70,000 in emergency aid, some of which to be used for fuel to transport medicine and food. The World Food Programme sent 72 tons of food and milk. The countries of Japan and the United States were the first to respond; the former provided $100,000, and the latter sent a Lockheed C-130 Hercules to distribute food. Switzerland later sent US$81,000 as a cash donation, while the European Economic Community sent US$227,000 worth of food and medicine. After Tropical Storm Gert struck in early September, various other countries sent additional money, food, medicine, and other goods.

The government of Honduras used one helicopter to deliver relief goods to stranded residents on roofs. Persistent rainfall following Bret caused additional flooding and damage, and the damage total between Bret and subsequent Tropical Storm Gert totaled US$60 million in Honduras.

== See also ==
- Other tropical cyclones named Bret
- Tropical Storm Alma (1974)
- Hurricane Cesar–Douglas (1996) – Traveled with similar path to Bret
- Hurricane Ernesto (2012)
- Hurricane Joan–Miriam
- Tropical Storm Bret (2017)
- Hurricane Bonnie (2022)
- Hurricane Julia (2022)
- List of Atlantic–Pacific crossover hurricanes
