= Tropical Storm Bret (2011) =

Atlantic tropical storm in 2011

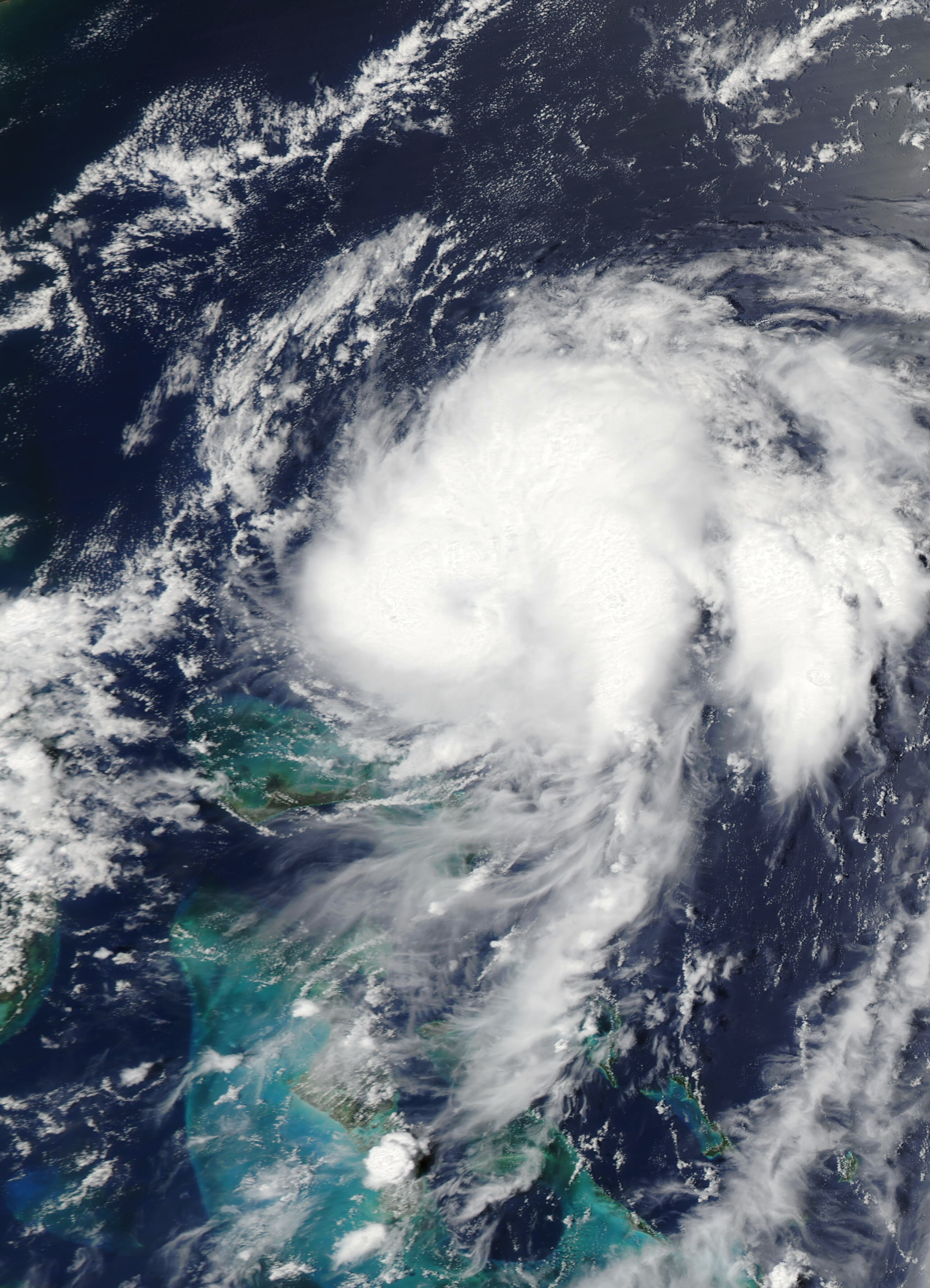
- Tropical Storm Bret at peak intensity north of the Bahamas on July 18

Meteorological history
- Formed: July 17, 2011
- Remnant low: July 22, 2011
- Dissipated: July 23, 2011

Tropical storm
- 1-minute sustained (SSHWS/NWS)
- Highest winds: 70 mph (110 km/h)
- Lowest pressure: 995 mbar (hPa); 29.38 inHg

Overall effects
- Fatalities: None reported
- Damage: Minimal
- Areas affected: Bahamas, Bermuda, East Coast of the United States
- IBTrACS /
- Part of the 2011 Atlantic hurricane season

Tropical Storm Bret was the second named storm of the 2011 Atlantic hurricane season. Bret formed along the southwestern periphery of a weather front north of the Bahamas on July 17. At first, the storm moved little and gradually strengthened in response to favorable upper-level conditions, reaching peak sustained winds of 70 mph (110 km/h). Steering currents in the area subsequently became better established, and Bret turned toward the northeast only to encounter a substantial increase in vertical wind shear. Despite the shear, the storm maintained a well-defined wind circulation for several days, with intermittent bursts of thunderstorms near its center. By July 22, Bret had been devoid of strong thunderstorm activity for several hours, prompting the National Hurricane Center to discontinue public advisories when it was located about 375 miles (604 km) north of Bermuda.

Since Bret remained over the open Atlantic for most of its existence, its effects on land were limited. While moving little, the storm produced inclement weather and widespread cloudiness over much of the north-central Bahamas. Squalls off the eastern coast of Florida generated rough seas along coastlines, injuring a number of people. Although it stayed well offshore, the storm enhanced tropical moisture over Bermuda, causing beneficial rainfall in dry areas.

== Meteorological history ==
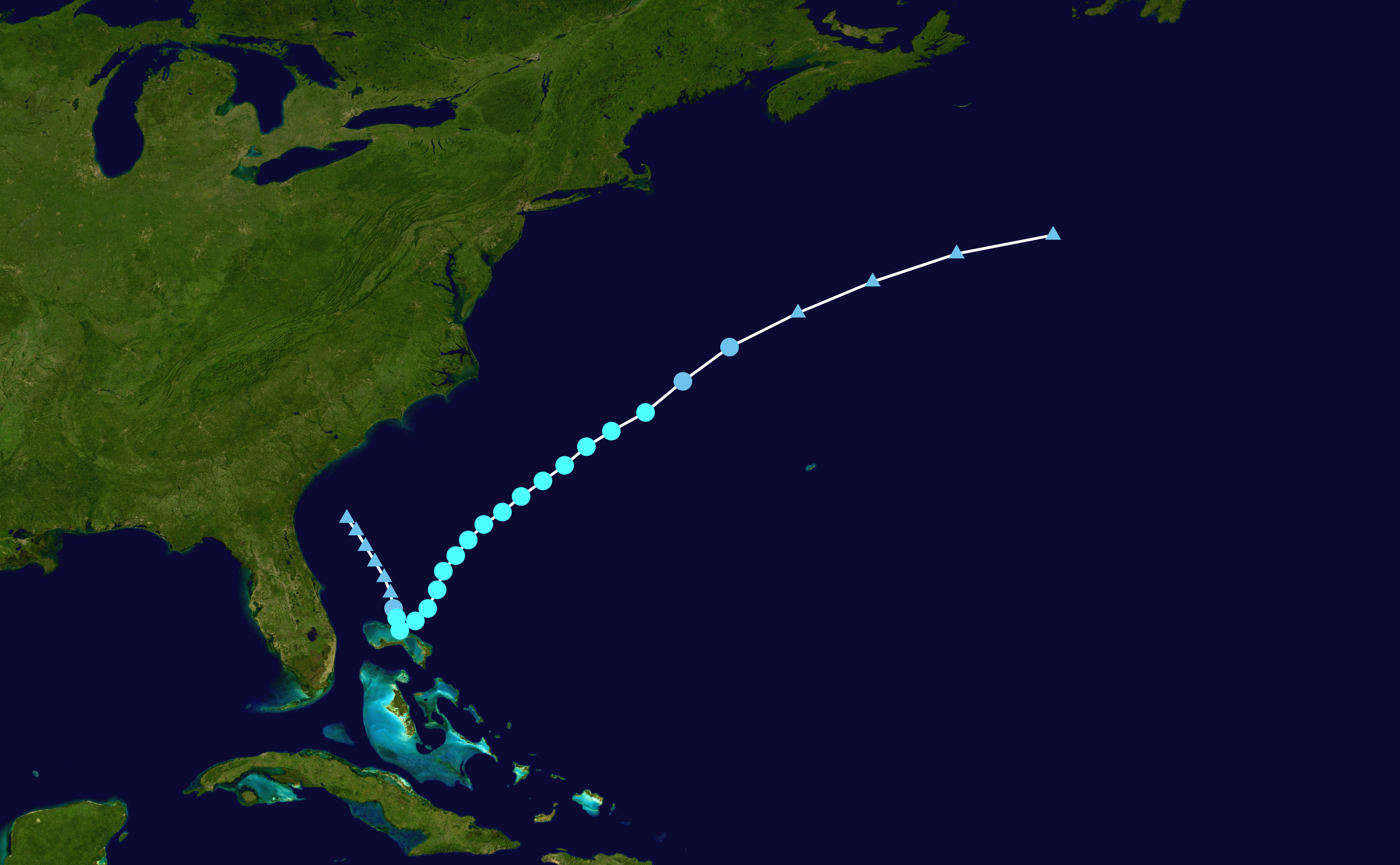
Map plotting the storm's track and intensity, according to the Saffir–Simpson scale Map key Saffir–Simpson scale Tropical depression (≤38 mph, ≤62 km/h) Tropical storm (39–73 mph, 63–118 km/h) Category 1 (74–95 mph, 119–153 km/h) Category 2 (96–110 mph, 154–177 km/h) Category 3 (111–129 mph, 178–208 km/h) Category 4 (130–156 mph, 209–251 km/h) Category 5 (≥157 mph, ≥252 km/h) Unknown Storm type Tropical cyclone Subtropical cyclone Extratropical cyclone, remnant low, tropical disturbance, or monsoon depression

In mid-July, 2011, a broad upper trough dropped southward over the northwest Atlantic, supporting a cold front that extended westward across Bermuda to inland over Georgia. The front produced a large area of light showers to its north, with its westernmost component remaining quasi-stationary over northeastern Florida. On July 16, a surface low developed along the decaying boundary, just off the coast, generating an area of sporadic convection north of the Bahamas. Although a wind circulation was initially absent and surface pressures were relatively high, the low later became better organized under abating shear conditions on July 17. A reconnaissance flight observed a closed circulation center about 100 mi (160 km), northwest of Great Abaco Island at 18:00 UTC that day, which confirmed the formation of a tropical depression. Just three hours later, the National Hurricane Center (NHC) issued its first advisory on the depression, and upgraded it to Tropical Storm Bret at 03:00 UTC the next day, owing to a quick increase in winds and thunderstorms around its center.

Situated along a weakness in the subtropical ridge, Bret drifted very slowly southward during the initial stages of its existence. Though traces of dry air approached it from the west, the cyclone continued to strengthen, as prominent bands of deep thunderstorms tightened around it eastern semicircle. Satellite images displayed a disorganized eye-like feature on July 18, suggesting a rather sharp increase in strength. Indeed, an additional reconnaissance flight into the cyclone found peak surface winds of around 70 mph (110 km/h), just below hurricane strength. Following its peak, Bret began to accelerate toward the northeast in response to building high pressure in the area. It fluctuated little in intensity for several hours, although a combination of high wind shear and a lack of tropical moisture inhibited further development. By July 19, the circulation center had become exposed and devoid of deep convection, and the storm weakened to 50 mph (80 km/h) winds upon moving through the increasingly hostile environment. Despite the unfavorable conditions, Bret retained this intensity for the next couple of days as it briefly slowed, with a distinct low-level circulation and a few patches of persistent thunderstorms over its southwestern quadrant.

Early on July 20, the heavily sheared cyclone began to reaccelerate within the deepening southwesterly wind flow. Over the next day, Bret continued to deteriorate in organization; however, a brief decline in the upper winds allowed intermittent bursts of convection to redevelop south of the exposed center. Bret eventually weakened to a tropical depression over cool ocean temperatures early on July 22, once again lacking significant convection while increasing in forward speed. Forecasters at the NHC noted that Bret remained "a maverick tropical cyclone by refusing to dissipate despite experiencing very hostile wind shear conditions," with ship data indications of prevailing strong winds. By 1500 UTC, however, the circulation had become ill-defined, prompting the NHC to declassify Bret as a tropical system about 375 mi (604 km) north of Bermuda. During the next several hours, the remnant low of Bret continued to move northeastward out into the Atlantic, until it dissipated on July 23.

== Preparations and impact ==
=== Bahamas ===
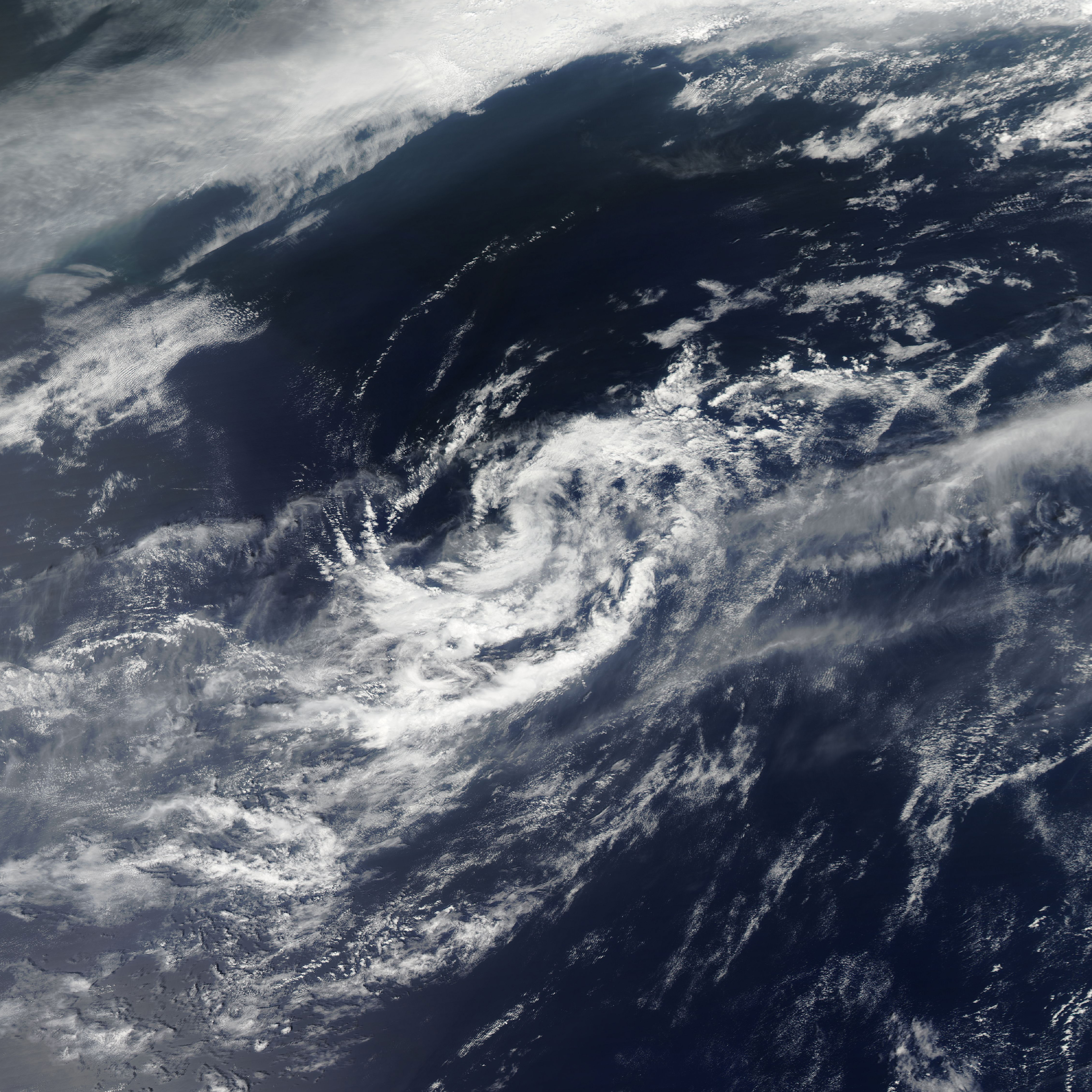
The remnants of Bret passing to the north of Bermuda on July 22

Upon the formation of a depression, the government of the Bahamas issued a tropical storm watch for northwestern islands of the nation. It was upgraded to a tropical storm warning on July 18, when the storm showed signs of intensification. Further south, a severe weather warning was in effect for New Providence and Andros Island, and authorities urged small craft operators to secure their vessels. The warnings were discontinued later that day as Bret turned away from the territory.

Since it initially moved little, Bret brought prolonged overcast conditions to much of the northern Bahamas, with most of the activity over the Abaco Islands and Grand Bahama. An estimated 3 in (76 mm) of precipitation fell in Abaco over the weekend of July 16–17. In addition, a weather station on the island reported gale-force gusting of up to 48 mph (77 km/h) at the height of the storm. The rain led to the cancellation of a local Little League baseball match. Outer rainbands spawned a waterspout that touched down on eastern Paradise Island, accompanied by lightning strikes and torrents. Nevertheless, locals considered the storm's impact to be generally positive, as its rains aided in alleviating mild drought conditions across the nation.

=== United States and Bermuda ===
Off the coast of Florida, the storm generated rough sea conditions with waves of up to 5 ft (1.5 m); high surf lightly injured several swimmers and surfers in Brevard County. Strong rip currents swept dozens of people out to sea, but all remained unharmed and were quickly rescued. Additionally, the waves washed ashore venomous jellyfish that stung more than 200 people near coastal beaches. Scattered funnel clouds and waterspouts were reported overseas, though the phenomena dissipated soon thereafter without affecting land. Onshore, Bret's effects were minimal; weak morning showers and breezy winds briefly brushed Brevard and Volusia Counties. As the storm lifted out of the area, it drew in a large mass of dry air, limiting chances of much-needed rain to subdue a large wildfire in the Okefenokee Swamp.

Light showers from the precursor front skirted Bermuda prior to tropical development, with 24-hour precipitation totals of no more than 0.87 in (22 mm) recorded on the territory. Moisture brought on by the storm from afar enhanced rainfall that ended months of dry conditions in Bermuda; 1.75 in (44 mm) of precipitation fell at L.F. Wade International Airport on July 18, with an additional 1.6 in (41 mm) recorded the next day. Although the rains proved to be mostly beneficial, minor flooding affected some local businesses in poor-drainage areas.

== See also ==
- Other storms of the same name
- Hurricane Shary (2010)
