= Salvador José Mañer =

Spanish writer and journalist

Salvador José Mañer (baptised 13 June 1676, Cádiz – 21 March 1751, Alanís) was a Spanish journalist, historian and writer.

== Selected works ==
- A Critical History of the Passion of Jesus Christ
- The political system of Europe
- The Swiss referee,
- History of Prince Eugene of Savoy,
- Count Teckeli historical novel,
- The famous marine man
- The critical Amphitheater
- Triumph of the Christian religion, and true Roman Church.
- New Explanation of many places of sacred Scripture, which claims to be well illustrated by the lack of natural light and natural sciences.
- History of the Rulers of the world.
- Collection of the Golden Bull, with notes, Madrid, 1745.
