= John Henry Brett =

Irish architect (1835–1920)

- Born: 1835
- Died: 1920; Belfast, County Antrim
- Other names: John H. Brett
- Occupations: Surveyor, Architect, Builder
- Known for: County surveyor, architect, builder

John H. Brett (1835–1920) was an Irish architect, builder, and county surveyor for counties Limerick (Western Division), Kildare and Antrim, active in late-nineteenth to early twentieth-century Ireland. He was notable in being a prolific designer of utilitarian structures as a county surveyor, with many practical schemes proposed. His designs, however, were often flamboyant in practicing a Ruskinian Gothic blend of Victorian Italianate and Venetian Renaissance styles, heavily influenced by the writer John Ruskin (1819–1900).

== Career ==
Brett's first employment was for William Dargan on the railways, then he was appointed county surveyor for the western division of County Limerick (1863), County Kildare (1869), County Antrim (1885). During the late 1860s, he also practiced with his father as Henry Brett & Son, which was joined by his brother Charles Henry Brett and they continued the business after their father's death in 1882 as John H. & H.C. Brett. He was elected a member of the Architectural Association in Ireland November 1872, ICEI in 1874, and Association of Municipal and County Engineers in 1891. Brett retired February 1914 and was made a JP for County Antrim.

== Personal life ==
He was born 1835 in Tobercurry, County Sligo, the son of builder Henry Brett and was the brother of Charles Henry Brett. He was educated at Waterford Academy. Brett married Mary Josephine Brady around 1876 in Dublin and have a daughter and five sons. His last address was at 3 Alexandra Gardens, Fortwilliam Park, Belfast.

== Works ==
- County Kildare Court House, Naas, County Kildare, Main Street South (1871-1873 for repairs & improvements; 1876 for addition of record court)
- Sewerage, Naas, County Kildare (1875–1879) Proposal (rejected on grounds of cost)
- County Wicklow Court House, Wicklow, County Wicklow (1876 for repairs and addition of new record court, estimated cost: £1,800.
- Military Barracks, Newbridge, County Kildare, Main Street (1879 for sewerage scheme)
- Mercer's Hospital, Mercer Street, Dublin (1880-1888 for competition-winning design of a new wing, containing offices, 3 new wards, lecture theatre, and accommodation for doctors, students and nurses. With W. M. Mitchell.)
- FBD Insurance (former National Bank of Ireland branch bank), 1 Great George's Street / Sargent's Lane, Waterford, County Waterford (1887)
- Sewerage scheme in Ballymena-Cullybackey, County Antrim (1901)
- Weir, Toomebridge, County Antrim (1910 repair with C. L. Boddie)
