= Antoine Bret =

French writer and playwright (1717–1792)

Antoine Bret (9 July 1717, Dijon – 25 February 1792, Paris aged 74) was an 18th-century French writer and playwright.

He practiced multiple genres and composed light poetry, comedies, novels, memoirs, parodic, and licentious tales. He wrote in a very clear style with new ideas everyday, but critics felt his work was clever rather than deep. This gave him a decent reputation, though he was never considered a great writer.

He was a person who knew a lot about theater and drama. He wrote several plays, but many critics noticed that his works did not have a lot of energy or comedy.

We owe him an edition of the Oeuvres by Molière, whose comments were appreciated. La Belle Alsacienne, ou Telle mère telle fille, a libertine novel first published in 1745 under the title La Belle Allemande, ou les Galanteries de Thérèse, which tells the story of a girl walking in the footsteps of her mother and letting her drive by in the ways of gallantry, was assigned to him as well as to Claude Villaret.

Antoine Bret was a member of the Académie de Stanislas in Nancy and Académie des Sciences, Arts et Belles-Lettres de Dijon. During several years, he contributed the Gazette de France and Journal encyclopédique and was also royal censor for operas.

== Publications ==
- 1743: Cythéride, histoire galante traduite du grec
- 1745: La Belle Allemande, ou les Galanteries de Thérèse, also known under the title La Belle Alsacienne, ou Telle mère telle fille and also attributed to Claude Villaret, Text online
- 1746: Lycoris, ou la Courtisane grecque
- 1749: Le *****, histoire bavarde, Text online
- 1751: Memoires sur la vie de mademoiselle de Lenclos, Text online
- 1765: Essai de contes moraux et dramatiques
- 1770: Essai d'une Poétique à la mode.

Theatre

- 1744: Le Déguisement pastoral, one-act opéra comique, Paris, Théâtre de la foire Saint-Laurent, 27 July
- 1744: Le Quartier d'hiver, comedy in 1 act and in verse, with Claude Villaret and Claude Godard d'Aucour, Paris, Théâtre-Français, 4 December
- 1747: L'École amoureuse, one-act comedy, in verse, Paris, Théâtre-Français, 11 September
- 1747: Le Concert, comedy in 1 act and in prose, Paris, Théâtre-Français, 16 November
- 1750: La Double Extravagance, comedy in 3 acts and in verse, Paris, Théâtre-Français, 27 July
- 1753: Le Parnasse moderne, one-act opéra comique, Paris, Théâtre de la foire Saint-Germain, 3 February
- 1753: Le Calendrier des vieillards, one-act opéra comique, Paris, Théâtre de la foire Saint-Germain, 7 April
- 1755: Le Jaloux, comedy in 3 acts and in verse, Paris, Théâtre-Français, 15 May
- 1758: L'Orpheline, ou le Faux généreux, comedy in 3 acts and in verse, Paris, Théâtre-Français, 18 January
- 1763: Le Protecteur bourgeois, ou la Confiance trahie, comedy in five acts and in verse, 13 October, Text online
- 1764: L'Épreuve indiscrète, two-act comedy in verse, Paris, Théâtre-Français, 30 January
- 1765: Le Mariage par dépit, three-act comedy in prose, Paris, Théâtre-Français, 13 June
- 1778: Les Deux Julies, ou le Père crédule, three-act comédie-farce in free verse, imitated from the Bacchides by Plautus
- 1785: L'Hôtellerie, ou le Faux Ami, drama in 5 acts and in verse, Paris, Théâtre de l'Odéon, 30 September
- undated: La Maison, comedy in two acts and in verse
- undated: L'Humeur à l'épreuve, comedy in one act and in prose
- undated: Les Lettres anonymes, comedy in four acts and in verse.

Collected works

- 1772: Œuvres de M. Bret, Text online : 1. Fables orientales et poésies diverses 2. Le Protecteur bourgeois 3. Réflexions sur la littérature
- 1789: Œuvres de M. Bret, 2 vol., Text online : 1. L'École amoureuse. La Double Extravagance. Le Jaloux. L'Humeur à l'épreuve. Le Faux Généreux 2. La Maison. Le Protecteur bourgeois. Les Lettres anonymes. Les Deux Julies

Édition de Molière

- 1778: Œuvres complètes de Molière, avec des remarques grammaticales, des avertissements et des observations sur chaque pièce, 6 vol., 1773; 8 vol.

== Sources ==
- Gustave Vapereau, Dictionnaire universel des littératures, Paris, Hachette, 1876, (p. 324)
- Ferdinand Hoefer, Nouvelle Biographie générale, t. 7, Paris, Firmin-Didot, 1853, (p. 338)
