= Brent, Cornwall =

Coordinates: 50.3332°N 4.5111°W

Brent
- Location within Cornwall
- OS grid reference: SX213511
- Civil parish: Polperro
- Unitary authority: Cornwall
- Ceremonial county: Cornwall
- Region: South West
- Country: England
- Sovereign state: United Kingdom
- Post town: LOOE
- Postcode district: PL13
- Dialling code: 01503
- Police: Devon and Cornwall
- Fire: Cornwall
- Ambulance: South Western
- UK Parliament: South East Cornwall

Brent is a housing estate in Cornwall, England, UK. It is situated 500 metres (550 yd) east of the village of Polperro, within the civil parish of Polperro and 4 miles (6.4 km) west of the neighbouring town of Looe.
