= Bret (given name) =

Bret is a male given name, which derives from Breton, a person from Brittany in France.

== People with the name ==
- Bret Anderson (born 1974), Canadian football player
- Bret Baier (born 1970), American journalist
- Bret Bergmark (born 1973), American mixed martial artist
- Bret Bielema (born 1970), American football coach
- Bret Blevins (born 1960), American comic book artist
- Bret Boone (born 1969), American baseball player
- Bret Cooper (born 1970), American football player
- Bret Easton Ellis (born 1964), American writer
- Bret Gilliam (1951-2023), American diver
- Bret Haaland (born 1959), American animator
- Bret Harrison (born 1982), American actor
- Bret Hart (born 1957), Canadian-American wrestler
- Bret Harte (1836–1902), American author
- Bret Hedican (born 1970), American ice hockey player
- Bret Iwan (born 1982), American voice actor
- Bret Anthony Johnston (born 1972), American writer
- Bret McKenzie (born 1976), New Zealand musician and actor
- Bret Myers (born 1980), American soccer player and professor
- Bret Michaels (born 1963), American singer
- Bret Morrison (1912–1978), American actor
- Bret Saberhagen (born 1964), American baseball player
- Bret Schundler (born 1959), American politician
- Bret Stephens (born 1973), American journalist
- Bret Thornton (born 1983), Australian football player
- Bret Weinstein (born 1969), American podcaster, author, and former professor

== Fictional characters with the name ==
- Bret Leather, in the comic book series Planetary
- Bret Maverick, in the television series Maverick and subsequent movies
- Bret Rensselaer, in several spy novels by Len Deighton

== See also ==
- Brett
- Brent
