= John Brett (Royal Navy officer) =

Royal Navy admiral (died 1785)

Admiral John Brett
- Died: 1785
- Military career
- Allegiance: Great Britain
- Branch: Royal Navy
- Service years: c. 1722–1785
- Rank: Admiral
- Commands: HMS Grampus; HMS Roebuck; HMS Anglesea; HMS Sunderland; HMS Chichester; HMS St. George; HMS Namur
- Conflicts: War of the Austrian Succession; Seven Years' War; Siege of Louisbourg

Admiral John Brett (died 1785) was an officer of the Royal Navy, who rose to the rank of admiral.

== Life ==
Brett was probably the son or a relation of Captain Timothy Brett, with whom he went to sea in the sloop Ferret about the year 1722, with the rating of captain's servant. In May 1727 he followed Timothy Brett to the Deal Castle, and in the following November to the yacht William and Mary. On 2 March 1734 he was promoted to be lieutenant; in 1740 he commanded the sloop HMS Grampus in the Mediterranean; and on 25 March 1741 was posted into the 40-gun HMS Roebuck by Vice-Admiral Nicholas Haddock, whom he brought home a passenger, invalided, in May 1742. In November 1742 he was appointed to the Anglesea, and in April 1744 to the 60-gun Sunderland.

He was still in the Sunderland and in company with the Captain, Hampton Court and Dreadnought, when, on 6 January 1745, they fell in with, and did not capture, the two French ships, Neptune and Fleuron. The chase later brought criticism and legal proceedings instigated both by and against Captain Savage Mostyn of Hampton Court, but Sunderland had had her mainmast carried away at an early period of the chase, and Brett escaped opprobrium. He was afterwards sent out to join Commodore Peter Warren at Cape Breton, and took part in the operations which resulted in the capture of Louisburg.

In 1755 he commanded the Chichester in the squadron sent under Rear-Admiral Francis Holburne to reinforce Edward Boscawen on the coast of North America. On 19 May 1756 he was appointed to the St. George, and on 1 June was ordered to turn over to HMS Namur. Three days afterwards a promotion of admirals came out, in which Brett was included, with his proper seniority, as rear-admiral of the white. He refused to take up the commission, and it was accordingly cancelled. No reason for this refusal appears on record, and the correspondence that must have taken place between Brett and the Admiralty or Lord Anson has not been preserved. It is quite possible that there had been some question as to whether his name should or should not be included in the promotion, and that this had come to Brett's knowledge; but the story, as told by Charnock, of his name having been in the first instance omitted, is contradicted by the official list. From this time Brett lived in retirement, occupying himself, to some extent, in literary pursuits, translating the works of the Spanish scholar Benito Jerónimo Feijóo y Montenegro. In 1777-9 he published 'Translations of Father Feyjoo's Discourses' (4 vols. 8vo); and in 1780 'Essays or Discourses selected from the Works of Feyjoo, and translated from the Spanish' (2 vols. 8vo). A letter, dated Gosport, 3 July 1772, shows that he corresponded with John Wilkes on friendly terms, and ranked himself with him as 'a friend of liberty.' He speaks also of his wife and children, of whom nothing further seems to be known. By seniority he was promoted to admiral on 29 January 1770. He died in 1785.
