= List of storms named Bret =

The name Bret has been used for eight tropical cyclones in the Atlantic Ocean.

- Tropical Storm Bret (1981), made landfall in southern Maryland, no real damage
- Tropical Storm Bret (1987), short-lived storm, remained in the eastern Atlantic Ocean
- Tropical Storm Bret (1993), passed over Venezuela, killing 184
- Hurricane Bret (1999), Category 4 hurricane; made landfall in southern Texas, causing minimal damage
- Tropical Storm Bret (2005), short-lived storm, made landfall near Tuxpan, Veracruz, Mexico
- Tropical Storm Bret (2011), strong tropical storm, threatened the Bahamas before turning away
- Tropical Storm Bret (2017), formed southeast of Trinidad and affected portions of the southern Windward Islands and the Paria Peninsula of Venezuela
- Tropical Storm Bret (2023), strong tropical storm, affected portions of the Lesser Antilles.
