= Sammy Brett =

Welsh footballer

Personal information
- Full name: Samuel Stephen Brett
- Date of birth: 25 December 1879
- Place of birth: St Asaph, Wales
- Date of death: 1939 (aged 59–60)
- Positions: Inside right; centre forward

Senior career*
Years	Team	Apps	(Gls)
- St Asaph YMCA
1897–1898	Southport Central		
1898–1899	West Bromwich Albion	8	(2)
- Wellingborough
	Brentford	0	(0)
- * Club domestic league appearances and goals

Samuel Stephen Brett (25 December 1879 – 1939) was a Welsh professional footballer who played as a forward in the Football League for West Bromwich Albion.

== Career statistics ==
Appearances and goals by club, season and competition
Club	Season	League			FA Cup		Total	
Club	Season	Division	Apps	Goals	Apps	Goals	Apps	Goals
West Bromwich Albion	1898–99	First Division	2	0	0	0	2	0
West Bromwich Albion	1899–1900	First Division	6	2	2	1	8	3
Career total			8	2	2	1	10	3
