= Brent, Missouri =

Extinct hamlet in Missouri, U.S.

Coordinates: 36°21′51″N 89°44′08″W

Brent is an extinct town in Pemiscot County, in the U.S. state of Missouri. The GNIS classifies it as a populated place.

The community once had a schoolhouse, Brent School, now defunct. Brent was named after the proprietor of a local sawmill.
