= Brent (steam tug) =

British tugboat (built 1945)

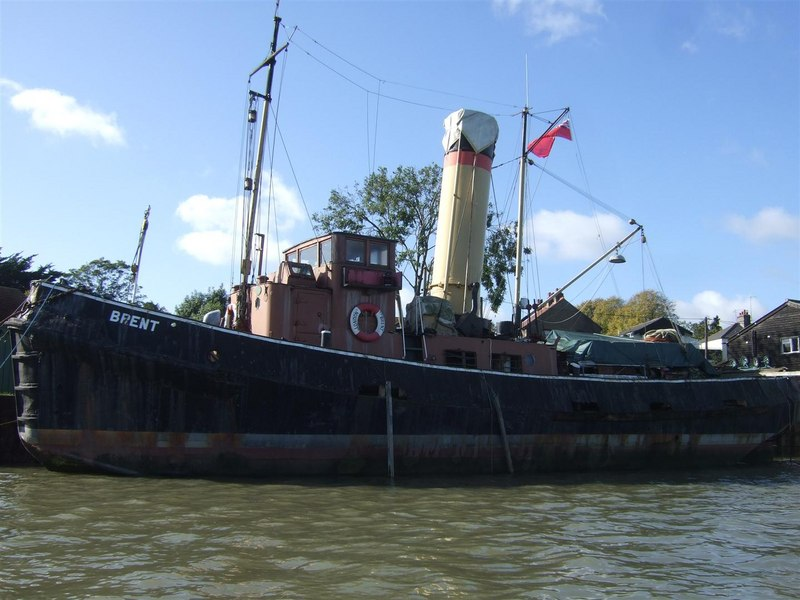
The Brent in 2010

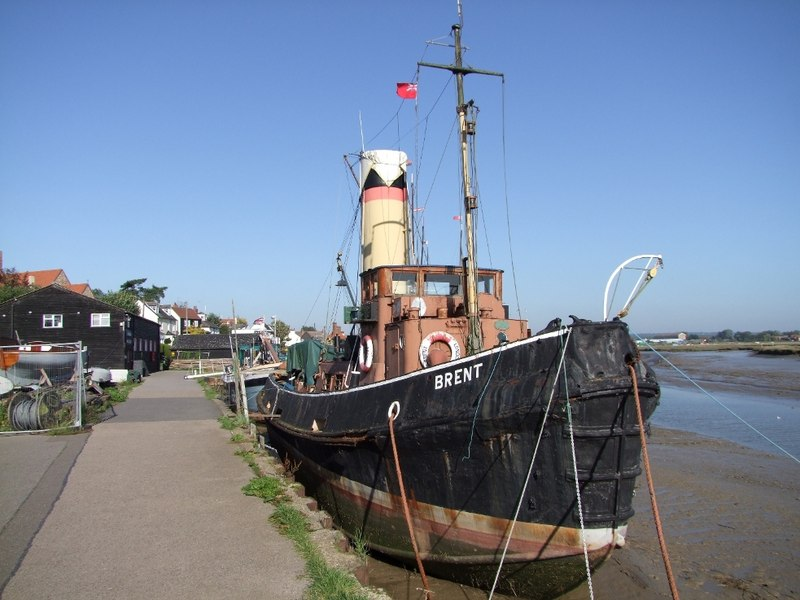
View of the bow in 2010

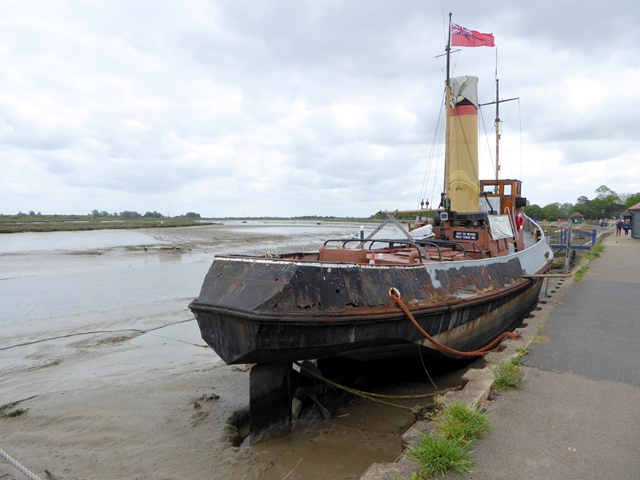
Stern view in 2016

The steam tug Brent is a tugboat. She was built in 1945 as the TID-class tug TID 159 for the Ministry of War Transport. Completed too late to take part in the Second World War, she was sold in 1946 to the Port of London Authority and renamed Brent. She spent the next 23 years as a dredger, removing debris from the navigable channels of the Thames, before the decline of the London Docks and the replacement of steam-powered vessels by diesel-fired ones led to her sale. Intended to be scrapped, she was bought from a ship-breaking yard by Ron Hall in 1971. Hall converted Brent into a residential yacht and his family sailed her recreationally, largely along the eastern coast of Britain. Problems with her boiler led her to be laid up in 1994. Since 2011 the vessel has been owned by a charitable trust which has sought to raise funds for her restoration.

== Construction ==
The Brent was built as TID 159 in 1945. The TID-class tugs were ordered by the Ministry of War Transport in 1942 to replace vessels lost during the Second World War. They were designed to be constructed of simple pre-fabricated sections which were manufactured inland before being assembled at a shipyard, often by women due to many men being away serving in the armed forces. The class was one of the first examples of prefabricated steel shipbuilding in the UK. This enabled them to be constructed quickly; at peak production one vessel was completed every four-and-a-half days.

The origin of the TID name is not known but it may be an initialism for Tug Invasion Duty, Tug Inshore Duties, Tug Intermediate Design or an abbreviation for tiddler, the latter based on its size. Some 182 TID-class vessels were constructed by 1946, most entering service with the Admiralty. TID 159 was among the last to be built, being assembled by William Pickersgill & Sons Ltd in Sunderland in 1945.

TID 159 has a single deck and a flat-bottomed hull. She has a waterline length of 65 feet (20 m), length overall of 73.61 feet (22.44 m), beam of 17 feet (5.2 m), moulded depth of 7.93 feet (2.42 m) and a draught of 6 feet (1.8 m). TID 159 had a gross register tonnage of 54. She had an eight-man crew.

In common with the last 92 ships of her class TID 159 was oil-fired, with a fuel tank of 8.6 long tons (8.7 t) capacity. Her single Scotch marine boiler, manufactured by John G. Kincaid & Company, and 2-cylinder compound reciprocating steam engine of 220 indicated horsepower (160 kW), drove a single screw and was capable of propelling the vessel at 8.5 knots (15.7 km/h; 9.8 mph).

== PLA service ==
TID 159 was completed too late to see war service, she was sold to the Port of London Authority (PLA) in 1946 and renamed Brent. During her time in PLA ownership works were carried out to strengthen her decks and bow. Additionally her aft bollards and forward Samson post were relocated and her windlass removed.

Brent served with the PLA's dredging department, helping to maintain navigation on the Thames. During the late 1940s she removed war-related debris and war-time sea mines from the river. She was also used occasionally to tow cargo lighters and barges between London's dockyards. In 1953, as one of the newer vessels in the PLA fleet, she had the honour of towing fireworks barges during the celebrations of the Coronation of Elizabeth II.

Brent was the last steam vessel in service with the PLA. She was taken out of use in 1969 at a time when the London Docks were in decline due to containerisation and steam-vessels were becoming obsolete, with the widespread adoption of diesel-powered tugs.

== Private ownership and conservation ==
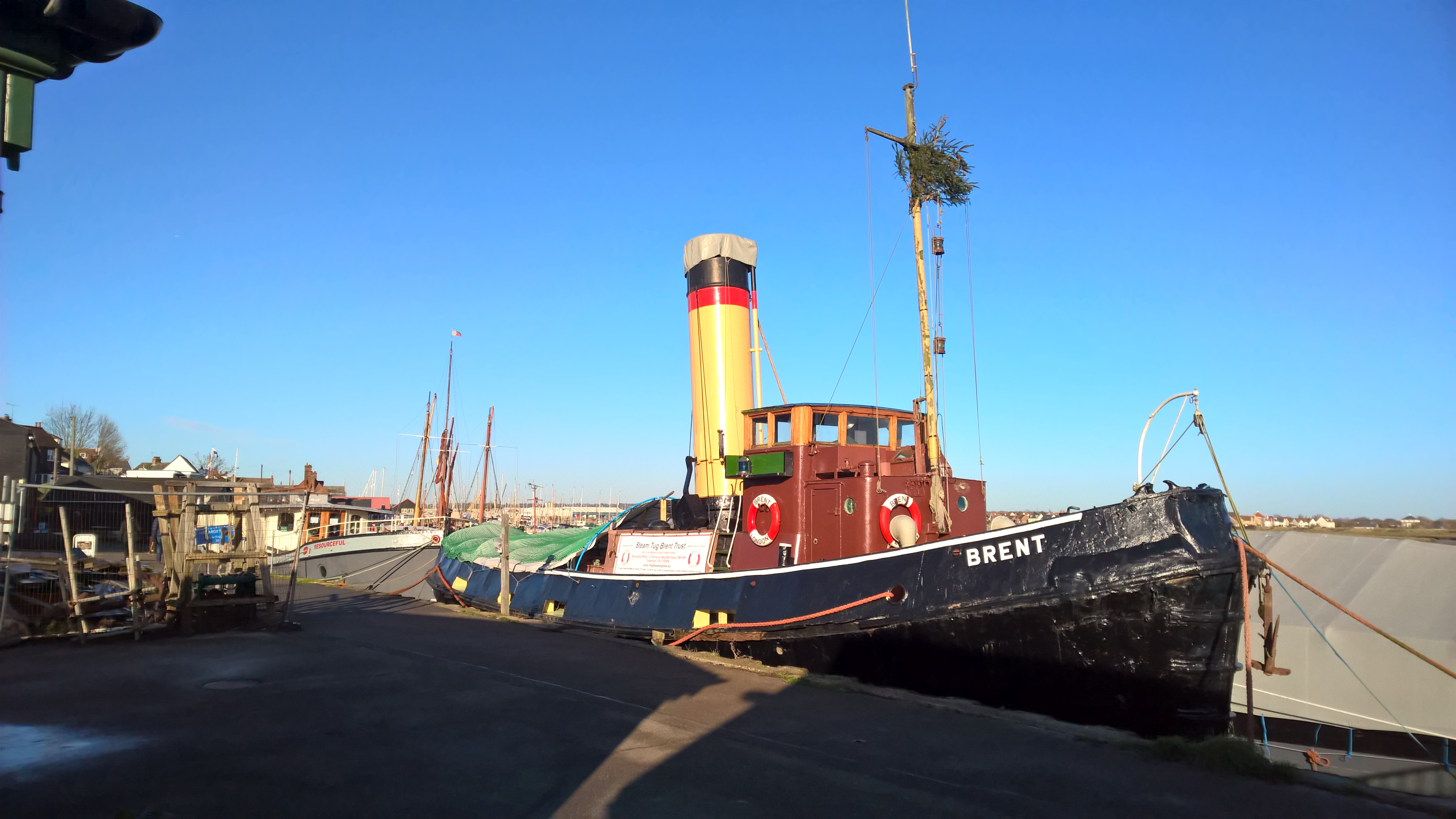
Brent in 2017 with a Christmas tree lashed to her mast

The PLA sold Brent to the shipbreaker Stour Salvage in Mistley, Essex, in 1970. Although she was in full working order the vessel was due to be broken up for scrap before she was purchased, in 1971, by Ron Hall. Hall moved the vessel to Maldon and converted her into a yacht with residential accommodation. The conversions left most of Brent's original fabric intact; Hall fitted a replacement windlass from one of Brent's classmates in 1973. Hall and his family travelled in Brent up and down the eastern British coast and, twice, across the North Sea to the Netherlands. She attended many rallies and festivals and won the Best Kept Privately Owned Power Craft prize at the Greenwich Festival in 1973. In 1976 Brent acted as an escort during a race of fishing smacks from Gravesend to Billingsgate. She was one of the boats that gathered on the Thames in 1977 to mark the Silver Jubilee of Elizabeth II.

Problems with her boiler led to Brent falling into disuse and she has remained at Maldon since 1994. In 2001 her hull was replated in anticipation of a future full restoration. The Steam Tug Brent Trust was established in 2010 to raise funds to maintain and restore her and the vessel was transferred into the trust's ownership in 2011. In 2010 Brent was entered onto the National Register of Historic Vessels. She has been berthed at Cook's Yard in Maldon. In May 2024 the trust was awarded a National Lottery Heritage Fund grant of £97,488. The money will go towards a new jetty and pontoon that will allow Brent access to the River Blackwater.
