= Jean Jacques Bret =

French professor of mathematics

Jean Jacques Bret (25 September 1781 – 29 January 1819) was a French professor of mathematics at the University of Grenoble. He worked on analytical geometry, polynomial roots, and the theory of conics and quadrics.

Bret was born in Mercuriol, Drôme, where his father was a notary. He went to study civil engineering at the École Polytechnique in 1800 but was unable to complete studies due to poor health. In 1804 he became a professor of mathematics at the lycée in Grenoble. In 1811 he became a professor at the faculty of science at the University of Grenoble and received a doctorate in 1812.

Bret's work was in coordinate geometry, both on the plane and in 3-dimensions. He was among the first to use a parametric form for the line in space. Bret suggested a rule for the superior limits of the roots of polynomial in 1815. The rule has been stated as: "if we add to unity a series of fractions whose numerators are the successive negative coefficients, taken positively, and whose denominators are the sums of the positive coefficients, including that of the first term, the greatest of the resulting values will be a superior limit of the roots of the equation." He also contributed to the study of continued fractions.
