= Lebret =

Lebret may refer to:

- Lebret, Saskatchewan, a village in Canada
- Évelyne Lebret (born 1938), French sprinter
- Jacques Lebret (d. 1645), French clergyman
- Louis-Joseph Lebret (1897–1966), French scientist

== See also ==
- Cardin Le Bret (1558–1655), French jurist
- Jean Le Bret (1872–1947), French sailor at the 1900 Summer Olympics
- Labret, a body piercing
