= Tropical Storm Bret (2023) =

Atlantic tropical storm

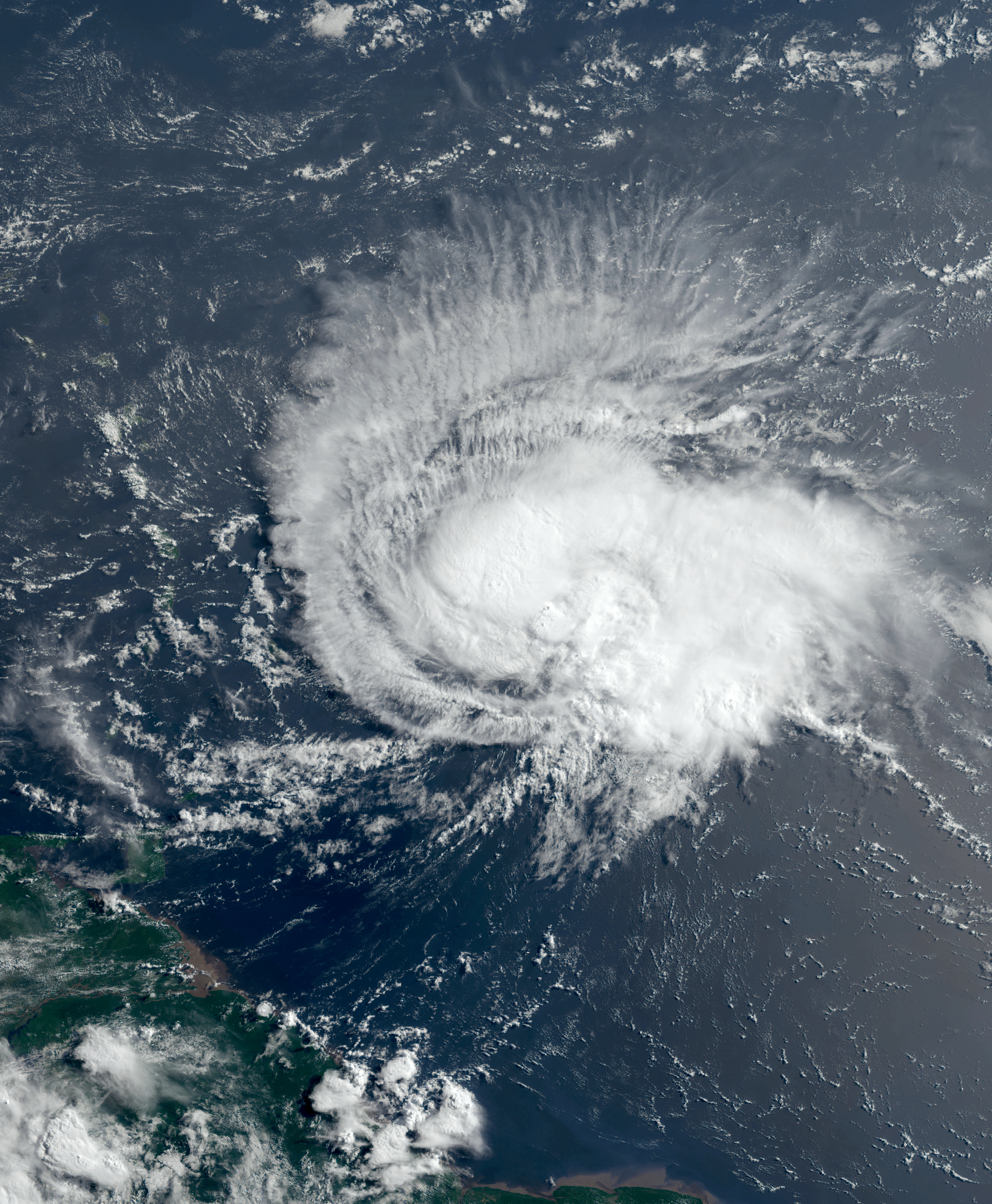
- Bret at peak intensity approaching the Windward Islands on June 22

Meteorological history
- Formed: June 19, 2023
- Dissipated: June 24, 2023

Tropical storm
- 1-minute sustained (SSHWS/NWS)
- Highest winds: 70 mph (110 km/h)
- Lowest pressure: 996 mbar (hPa); 29.41 inHg

Overall effects
- Fatalities: None
- Damage: >$445,000 (2023 USD)
- Areas affected: Windward Islands (mainly Barbados), Aruba, Colombia
- Part of the 2023 Atlantic hurricane season

Tropical Storm Bret was a strong tropical storm that brought gusty conditions and impacts to the Windward Islands and parts of northern South America. The second named storm (Note: Excludes a retroactively recognized subtropical storm in January) of the very active 2023 Atlantic hurricane season, Bret developed from a tropical wave that moved away from the coast of West Africa and formed east of Barbados on June 19. Slow development occurred and the system intensified into a tropical storm. Bret continued to drift west and passed directly over Saint Vincent as it continued to move into the Caribbean. As it entered the Windward Islands, hurricane hunters found that Bret had sustained winds of 70 mph (110 km/h) and a central pressure of 996 mbar (29.4 inHg). For the remainder of the day on June 23, Bret left the islands and passed north of Aruba on June 24. As the storm passed Aruba, it began to weaken; it opened into a trough near Colombia, marking its dissipation.

As Bret passed through the Windward Islands, many impacts were reported in some of the islands in the area. Many houses and buildings were damaged in Saint Vincent and the Grenadines, Saint Lucia, and Barbados. In Saint Lucia, much of the electrical grid was knocked out by Bret. Overall, damage from Bret was over US$445,000.

== Meteorological history ==
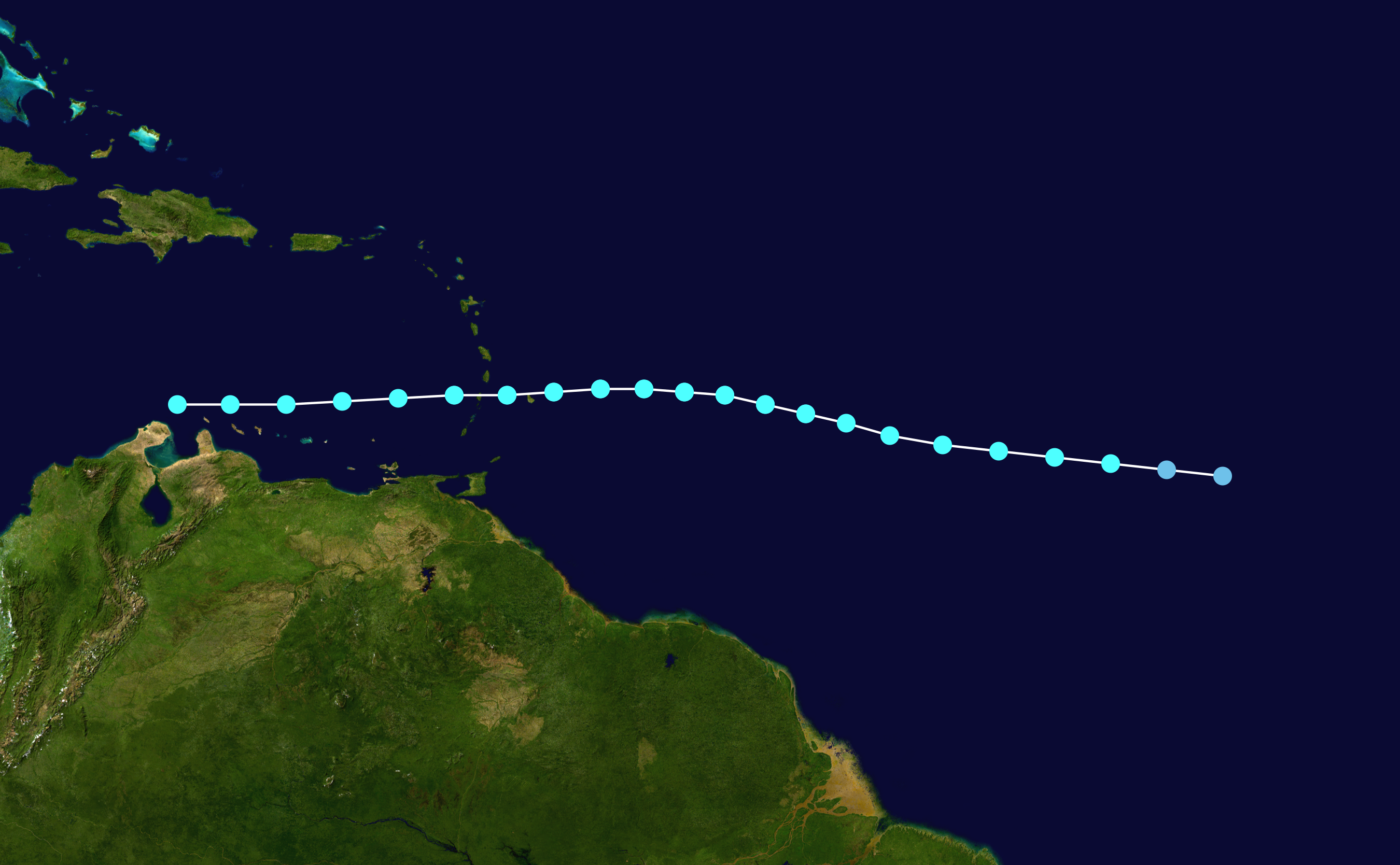
Map plotting the storm's track and intensity, according to the Saffir–Simpson scale Map key Saffir–Simpson scale Tropical depression (≤38 mph, ≤62 km/h) Tropical storm (39–73 mph, 63–118 km/h) Category 1 (74–95 mph, 119–153 km/h) Category 2 (96–110 mph, 154–177 km/h) Category 3 (111–129 mph, 178–208 km/h) Category 4 (130–156 mph, 209–251 km/h) Category 5 (≥157 mph, ≥252 km/h) Unknown Storm type Tropical cyclone Subtropical cyclone Extratropical cyclone, remnant low, tropical disturbance, or monsoon depression

On June 15, the NHC started to monitor a tropical wave that was about to move off the coast of West Africa into the Atlantic Ocean. The disturbance became better organized due to warm sea surface temperatures and favorable atmospheric conditions as it drifted westward towards the Caribbean. On the morning of June 19, the disturbance organized into Tropical Depression Three about 1,495 mi (2,410 km) east of Barbados, and strengthened into Tropical Storm Bret that afternoon. Gradual intensification occurred during the next couple of days as it headed west towards the Lesser Antilles. Hurricane hunters investigated Bret early on June 22 and found sustained winds of 70 mph (110 km/h) and a central pressure of 996 mbar (29.4 inHg). Soon after, Bret moved into an area of increased vertical wind shear, causing it to gradually weaken as it moved across the Lesser Antilles. Overnight on June 22–23, it passed just north of Barbados and directly over St. Vincent with sustained winds of 60 mph (95 km/h). Next, during the early hours of June 24, Bret passed just to the north of Aruba, Bonaire, and Curaçao as a weakening storm with an exposed low-level center, and soon opened into a trough near the Guajira Peninsula of Colombia. The remnant wave later crossed into Central America, contributing to the formation of Hurricane Beatriz.

== Preparations and impact ==
=== Preparations ===
Tropical storm warnings were issued in the Lesser Antilles in preparation for Bret. Multiple of InterCaribbean Airways and LIAT flights leaving Antigua and Barbuda were cancelled due to Bret. Schools and nurseries were shut down in preparation for Bret, and people across Saint Lucia and Saint Vincent and the Grenadines were urged to go to shelters to stay safe. Martinique issued a "red alert" as the storm approached.

Along the Caribbean coast of Venezuela, small fishing boats were prohibited from leaving the country due to stormy conditions. The La Guajira Peninsula in northern Colombia was placed on high alert due to the remnants of Tropical Storm Bret.

=== Impact ===
Both Martinique and Saint Lucia both reported gusty conditions that knocked down trees and powerlines. Grantley Adams International Airport on Barbados reported a sustained wind of 44 mph (70 km/h) and a gust to 56 mph (91 km/h) in thunderstorm activity well to the east of Bret's center. There were also 13 specific reports of damage on the island, including roof damage and flooding. Multiple inches of rain fell onto the islands as Bret passed. Hewanorra International Airport on Saint Lucia reported a wind gust of 69 mph (111 km/h) at 05:00 UTC on June 23, and officials reported that much of the island's electrical grid had been knocked out by the storm. The same conditions were also reported in Vieux Fort. Many homes were also damaged in Saint Vincent. Buildings in Barbados were also damaged, and high waves battered the coast of the island, damaging many things set up along the island's coast. In Martinique, four people were hospitalized after their catamaran sank during the storm, while in Saint Lucia, one house was completely swept away and others were severely damaged. Over 130 people on Saint Lucia and Saint Vincent alone needed shelter due to the damage caused on homes by the storm. The southern half of the island of Dominica saw gusty winds, but other than scattered floods, no damage was reported in the country. As far south as Grenada also saw heavy rainfall, mudslides and floods attributed to Tropical Storm Bret.

In Aruba, the village of Arashi Beach experienced rainfall as the storm passed by. Power outages and flooding in many parts of the island resulted from Bret, and impacts in Aruba were generally minimal. Curaçao saw rainfall, though no warnings were issued due to the storm.

Damage from Tropical Storm Bret totaled over $445,000, most of it in St. Lucia.

== See also ==
- Weather of 2023
- Tropical cyclones in 2023
- Other storms of the same name
