= Tom Brett =

English cricketer

Personal information
- Full name: Thomas Brett
- Born: 13 November 1989 (age 36); Kettering, Northamptonshire
- Batting: Right-handed
- Bowling: Slow left arm
- Role: Bowler

Domestic team information
- Years: Team
- 2010–2011: Northamptonshire

Career statistics
Competition	First-class	List A
Matches	2	6
Runs scored	2	2
Batting average	2.00	–
100s/50s	0/0	0/0
Top score	2	2*
Balls bowled	102	216
Wickets	2	5
Bowling average	66.00	41.60
5 wickets in innings	0	0
10 wickets in match	0	0
Best bowling	1/29	2/29
Catches/stumpings	0/–	2/–
- Source: CricInfo, 3 April 2011

Thomas Brett (born 13 November 1989) is an English cricketer who played for Northamptonshire County Cricket Club. He is a right-handed batsman and slow left arm orthodox bowler. He has played for Bedfordshire County Cricket Club since 2008.

Brett made his first-class cricket debut against Oxford MCCU at the start of the 2010 season. He then went on to play a number of One day games at the end of the season. Brett made a total of six List A and two first-class appearances for Northamptonshire. At the end of the 2011 season he was released. Away from England, Brett took 52 A grade wickets in the WACA competition for Joondalup Districts Cricket Club in Western Australia between 2008 and 2010.

Brett continued to make Second XI appearances for Northants until the end of the 2013 season and returned to play for Bedfordshire after being released by Northants. He took 39 wickets in six games for Bedfordshire in the 2017 Minor Counties Championship season including a career best 8/87. At the end of the 2017 season he played for Derbyshire's Second XI.
