= Brett Cooper (footballer) =

Australian rules footballer

Personal information
- Born: 11 August 1959 (age 67)
- Original team: Preston
- Height: 180 cm (5 ft 11 in)
- Weight: 89 kg (196 lb)
- Position: Forward

Playing career^{1}
Years	Club	Games (Goals)
1983	Collingwood	1 (0)
- ^{1} Playing statistics correct to the end of 1983.

Brett Cooper (born 11 August 1959) is a former Australian rules footballer who played with Collingwood in the Victorian Football League (VFL).

Cooper established himself at Preston in the Victorian Football Association (VFA) in the late 1970s and early 1980s, and he won Preston's best and fairest award in 1981. He joined Collingwood in 1983, although he would occasionally miss games due to his army commitments. Collingwood's secretary, John Birt, described Cooper as a "mini Rene Kink". After appearing in three reserves fixtures, Cooper played in Collingwood's round 12 win over Melbourne at VFL Park; it was the only VFL game of his career, and he had 10 disposals and kicked a behind.

During this time, Cooper struggled with heroin addiction. He first became addicted in 1979 before getting clean, but he became addicted again in late 1983. In 1984, he was sentenced to one year in prison for burglaries committed to support his habit. He got clean again while in prison, and returned to play VFA football. He played with Preston in 1986, was cleared to Box Hill at the start of 1987, and was cleared to Brunswick in July 1988.
