= 2023 Atlantic hurricane season =

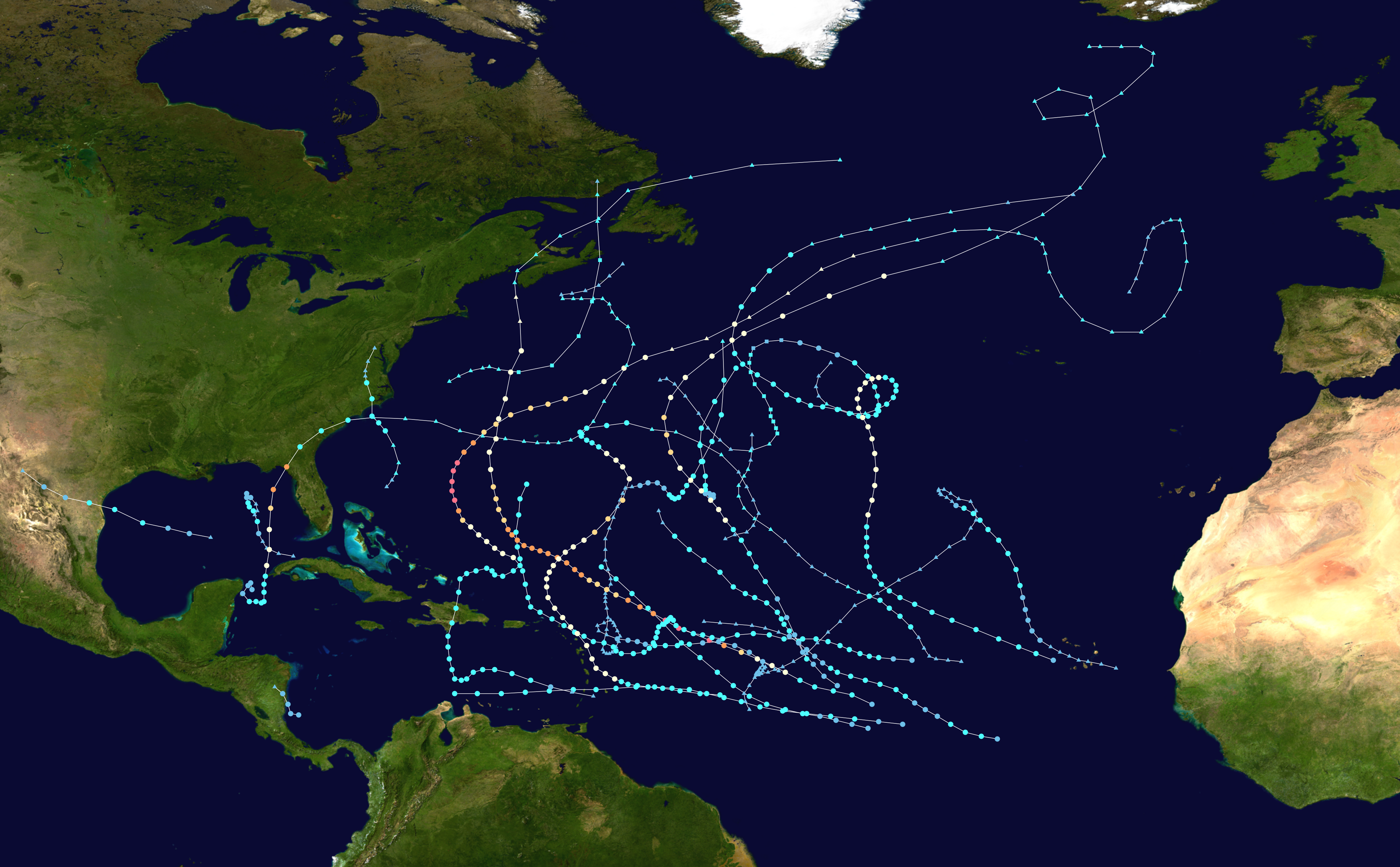
- Season summary map

Seasonal boundaries
- First system formed: January 16, 2023
- Last system dissipated: October 28, 2023

Strongest storm
- Name: Lee
  - Maximum winds: 165 mph (270 km/h) (1-minute sustained)
  - Lowest pressure: 926 mbar (hPa; 27.35 inHg)

Seasonal statistics
- Total depressions: 21
- Total storms: 20
- Hurricanes: 7
- Major hurricanes (Cat. 3+): 3
- ACE: 148.2
- Total fatalities: 19 total
- Total damage: > $4.13 billion (2023 USD)

Related articles
- Timeline of the 2023 Atlantic hurricane season; 2023 Pacific hurricane season; 2023 Pacific typhoon season; 2023 North Indian Ocean cyclone season

The 2023 Atlantic hurricane season was the fourth-most active Atlantic hurricane season on record with 20 named storms forming, (Note: The total includes an unnamed, belatedly recognized subtropical storm in January.) tied with 1933. Among them, 7 became hurricanes, with 3 reaching major hurricane strength. (Note: Hurricanes reaching Category 3 and higher—1-minute sustained winds higher than 110 miles per hour (178 km/h)—on the Saffir–Simpson scale are described as major hurricanes.) The season also had an above‑normal accumulated cyclone energy (ACE) rating of 148.2, despite the presence of the 2023–24 El Niño event, which typically results in less activity, and had the most storms for an El Niño year on record, largely due to record-warm sea surface temperatures across the Atlantic. The season officially began on June 1 and ended on November 30. These dates, adopted by convention, historically describe the period in each year when most tropical cyclogenesis occurs in the Atlantic. However, the formation of subtropical or tropical cyclones is possible at any time of the year, as demonstrated by the formation of a subtropical storm on January 16, the earliest start of an Atlantic hurricane season since Hurricane Alex in January 2016. Because the system was operationally assessed as non-tropical by the National Hurricane Center (NHC) and designated after the fact, it went without a name.

June saw two tropical storms—Bret and Cindy—form in the tropical Atlantic (south of 23.5°N, east of 60°W) for the first time on record. The former made landfall on Saint Vincent. An unprecedented stretch of activity commenced in late August. Tropical Storm Harold struck southern Texas on August 22, and Hurricane Franklin made landfall in the Dominican Republic as a tropical storm the following day, with the latter reaching peak intensity as a high-end Category 4 hurricane and bringing tropical-storm-force winds to Bermuda. After briefly attaining Category 4 strength on August 30, Hurricane Idalia made landfall in Florida as a Category 3 hurricane. In early September, Hurricane Lee rapidly intensified into a Category 5 hurricane, then later made multiple landfalls in Atlantic Canada as a strong extratropical cyclone. Later that month, Tropical Storm Ophelia made landfall in North Carolina. In October, both Tropical Storm Philippe, the longest-lived tropical cyclone in the Atlantic this year, and Hurricane Tammy made landfall on Barbuda. Also that month, Tropical Depression Twenty‑One made landfall in Nicaragua. With Tammy's dissipation on October 28, the season effectively ended, as no tropical cyclones formed thereafter. The systems of this season collectively produced more than $4.22 billion (USD) (Note: All damage figures are in 2023 USD, unless otherwise noted) in damage, and caused 19 fatalities.

Despite the above-normal activity this season, El Niño‑enhanced wind shear prevented many of the storms from significantly strengthening. Additionally, the El Niño event weakened the Bermuda High, allowing systems to curve northward or take more easterly tracks out to sea, as opposed to being pushed westward towards the continental United States, Mexico, or Central America. As a result, only a few systems impacted land or caused significant damage this season, with just three making landfall in the U.S. For the first time since the 2014 season, no names were retired this year by the World Meteorological Organization (WMO).

== Seasonal forecasts ==
Predictions of tropical activity in the 2023 season
Source	Date	Named storms	Hurricanes	Major hurricanes	Ref
Average (1991–2020)		14.4	7.2	3.2
Record high activity		30	15	7†
Record low activity		1	0†	0†
TSR	December 6, 2022	13	6	3
TSR	April 6, 2023	12	6	2
UA	April 7, 2023	19	9	5
CSU	April 13, 2023	13	6	2
NCSU	April 13, 2023	11–15	6–8	2–3
MU	April 27, 2023	15	7	3
UPenn	May 1, 2023	12–20	N/A	N/A
SMN	May 4, 2023	10–16	3–7	2–4
NOAA	May 25, 2023	12–17	5–9	1–4
UKMO*	May 26, 2023	20	11	5
TSR	May 31, 2023	13	6	2
CSU	June 1, 2023	15	7	3
UA	June 16, 2023	25	12	6
CSU	July 6, 2023	18	9	4
TSR	July 7, 2023	17	8	3
UKMO	August 1, 2023	19	9	6
CSU	August 3, 2023	18	9	4
TSR	August 8, 2023	18	8	3
NOAA	August 10, 2023	14–21	6–11	2–5
	Actual activity	20	7	3
* June–November only † Most recent of several such occurrences. (See all)

In advance of, and during, the 2023 Atlantic hurricane season, various forecasts of hurricane activity were issued by national meteorological services, scientific agencies, and research groups. Among them were forecasts from the United States National Oceanic and Atmospheric Administration (NOAA)'s Climate Prediction Center, Mexico's Servicio Meteorológico Nacional (SMN), Tropical Storm Risk (TSR), the United Kingdom's Met Office (UKMO), and Colorado State University (CSU). Forecasters track weekly and monthly changes in significant factors that help determine the number of tropical storms, hurricanes, and major hurricanes within a particular year. According to NOAA and CSU, the average Atlantic hurricane season between 1991 and 2020 contained roughly 14 tropical storms, seven hurricanes, three major hurricanes, and an accumulated cyclone energy (ACE) index of 74–126 units. Broadly speaking, ACE is a measure of the power of a tropical or subtropical storm multiplied by the length of time it existed. It is only calculated for full advisories on specific tropical and subtropical systems reaching or exceeding wind speeds of 39 mph (63 km/h). NOAA typically categorizes a season as above-average, average, or below-average based on the cumulative ACE index, but the number of tropical storms, hurricanes, and major hurricanes within a hurricane season is sometimes also considered.

=== Pre-season forecasts ===
On December 6, 2022, TSR released the first early prediction for the 2023 Atlantic season, predicting a slightly below average year with 13 named storms, 6 hurricanes, and 3 major hurricanes. Their updated prediction on April 6, 2023, called for a similar number of hurricanes, but reduced the number of named storms and major hurricanes by one. The following day, the University of Arizona (UA) posted their forecast calling for a very active season featuring 19 named storms, 9 hurricanes, 5 major hurricanes, and an ACE index of 163 units. On April 13, CSU researchers released their prediction calling for 13 named storms, 6 hurricanes, 2 major hurricanes, and an ACE index of 100 units. On April 27, University of Missouri (MU) issued their predictions of 10 named storms, 4 between categories one and two, and 3 major hurricanes. On May 1, University of Pennsylvania (UPenn) released their forecast for 12 to 20 named storms. On May 4, SMN issued its forecast for the Atlantic basin, anticipating 10 to 16 named storms overall, with 3 to 7 hurricanes, and 2 to 4 major hurricanes. On May 25, NOAA announced its forecast, calling for 12 to 17 named storms, 5 to 9 hurricanes, and 1 to 4 major hurricanes, with a 40% chance of a near-normal season and 30% each for an above-average season and a below-average season. One day later, UKMO issued its forecast calling for an extremely active season, with 20 named storms, 11 hurricanes, 5 major hurricanes, and an ACE index of 222 units.

There was a wide range of conclusions among the groups making pre-season forecasts. With regard to number of hurricanes, projections ranged from 5 by SMN to 11 by UKMO. This reflected an uncertainty on the part of the various organizations about how the expected late-summer El Niño event and near record-warm sea surface temperatures would together impact tropical activity.

=== Mid-season forecasts ===
On June 1, CSU issued an updated forecast, now expecting a near-average season with 15 named storms, 7 hurricanes, 3 major hurricanes, and an ACE index of 125 units, due to a rise in main development region sea surface temperatures to near record-highs, which, they reasoned, could offset increased wind shear from the impending El Niño. On June 16, UA updated its seasonal prediction, which indicates a very active hurricane season, with 25 named storms, 12 hurricanes, 6 major hurricanes, and an ACE index of 260 units. On July 6, CSU issued an updated forecast increasing their numbers, predicting a very active season; they now expect 18 storms, 9 hurricanes, and 4 major hurricanes, with an ACE index of 160 units. The following day, TSR released the first seasonal prediction, predicting a slightly above average year with 17 named storms, 8 hurricanes, and 3 major hurricanes and an ACE index of 125. UKMO updated their forecast on August 1, slightly decreasing the number of tropical storms and hurricanes to 19 and 9, respectively, while increasing the number of major hurricanes from 5 to 6. On August 3, CSU issued their final prediction, with no changes to the amount of tropical storm, hurricanes, and major hurricanes. TSR's last forecast, published on August 8, only adjusted the number of major hurricanes from two to three. Citing record-warm sea surface temperatures, a warm phase of the Atlantic multidecadal oscillation, and El Niño, NOAA's second prediction, released on August 10, called for 14 to 21 tropical storms, 6 to 11 hurricanes, and 2 to 5 major hurricanes.

== Seasonal summary ==
=== Background ===
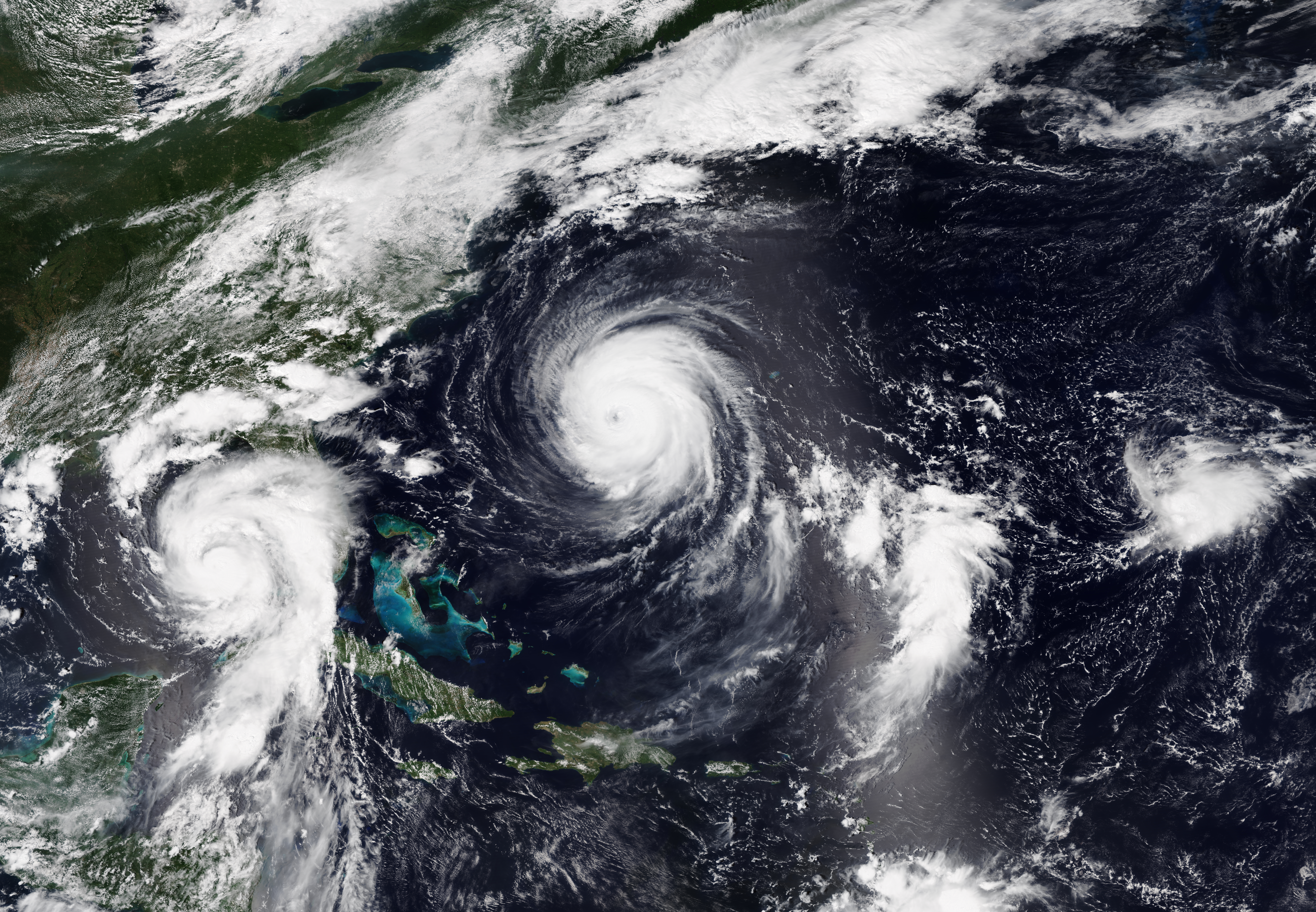
Three simultaneous tropical cyclones in the west-central Atlantic on August 29: Idalia (left), Franklin (center), and Tropical Depression Eleven, which would become Jose (far right). The remnants of Gert, which later regenerated, are also visible between Franklin and Eleven.

Officially, the 2023 Atlantic hurricane season ran from June 1 to November 30. A total of 21 tropical cyclones formed, 20 of which intensified into nameable storms, ranking the season as the fourth-most active in terms of number of tropical or subtropical storms, tied with 1933. Of those, seven strengthened into a hurricane, with three systems reaching major hurricane intensity. Thus, the season was above-average compared to NOAA's 1991–2020 mean of fourteen named storms, while equaling the normal number of hurricanes and major hurricanes, seven and three, respectively. NOAA attributed the abnormally high number of named storms to record-warm sea surface temperatures across the Atlantic, mostly offsetting the effects of a strong El Niño event, which typically limits activity in the basin. In fact, the season had the most tropical or subtropical storms for a year with El Niño conditions present since records began. Meteorologists such as Jonathan Belles and Phil Klotzbach argued that El Niño impacted the season by significantly weakening and shifting the Bermuda high-pressure system eastward, causing several storms to recurve out to sea much farther east than usual or drift aimlessly over the central Atlantic, rather than being pushed westward towards the continental United States, Mexico, or Central America. Consequently, only three systems made landfall in the United States.

Few tropical cyclones in the Atlantic in 2023 left significant impacts. The most destructive storm, Idalia, caused 12 deaths and approximately $3.6 billion in damage in August despite making landfall in Florida at Category 3 hurricane intensity, due to crossing mostly rural areas. During the same month, Franklin rendered at least $90 million in damage and three deaths, all in the Dominican Republic, which it struck as a weak tropical storm. Although Lee remained offshore while a tropical cyclone, rough seas generated by the storm drowned four people, while the remnants resulted in about $50 million in damage, mostly in Maine and Atlantic Canada. In September, Ophelia caused approximately $450 million in damage along the East Coast of the United States. Overall, the storms of the 2023 season collectively inflicted more than $4.22 billion in damage and 19 fatalities.

This season's ACE index was approximately 148.2 units, roughly 21% above average. This number represents sum of the squares of the maximum sustained wind speed (knots) for all named storms while they are at least tropical storm intensity, divided by 10,000. Therefore, tropical depressions are not included.

In 2023, NOAA logged 468 flight hours for their Hurricane Hunter missions in the Atlantic. The aircraft deployed more than 1,400 scientific instruments and conducted 120 entries into the eye of a storm. NOAA launched several drones, including Black Swift drone for the first time into Tammy, both for obtaining observations and evaluating the efficiency of this method of collecting data. Additionally, NOAA used their aircraft to assist with emergency response to Idalia and Lee, conducting a combined 28 flight hours to obtain aerial imagery. The National Ocean Service, an agency of NOAA, surveyed just over 42 mi (68 km) of coastline, including identifying 29 potential marine obstructions, in the aftermath of Idalia.

=== Early activity ===
The 2023 Atlantic hurricane season commenced unexpectedly on January 16, when an unnamed subtropical storm formed off the northeastern U.S. coast then moved over Atlantic Canada. Operationally, the NHC considered the storm to be non-tropical, with minimal likelihood of transitioning into a subtropical or tropical cyclone. A few months later, however, following a post-storm evaluation of the system, it was redesignated as subtropical, but intentionally left unnamed. No additional tropical or subtropical activity occurred in the basin prior to the official start of the season on June 1. Tropical Depression Two formed on opening day in the Gulf of Mexico. It became the season's first named storm, Arlene, on June 2. Later that month, tropical storms Bret and Cindy formed, becoming the first instance of two Atlantic tropical cyclones active simultaneously in June since 1968. The two developed in the Main Development Region (MDR) from successive tropical waves coming off the coast of West Africa. Their formation also marked the first time on record that two tropical storms formed in the MDR during the month of June. Next, Subtropical Storm Don formed over the central Atlantic on July 14. A long-lived storm, it later became fully tropical and strengthened into the season's first hurricane as it meandered around the ocean far from land.

=== Peak to late activity ===
Following a lull in activity, tropical cyclogenesis increased to an unprecedented level in late August. Between August 19 and 21, four depressions formed, which quickly intensified into named storms: Emily, Franklin, Gert, and Harold. Emily formed in the eastern Atlantic, lasting only about 24 hours before dissipating. Franklin moved across the Dominican Republic as a tropical storm, before intensifying into a Category 4 hurricane in the western Atlantic. Gert became a remnant low on August 22, but regenerated into a tropical depression at the end of the month. Tropical Storm Harold affected south Texas and brought much needed rainfall to the region. Those four were followed by two more systems during last week of the month: Idalia and Jose. Idalia formed on August 26 in the northwestern Caribbean, intensified into a Category 4 hurricane, then made landfall in the Big Bend region of Florida at Category 3 strength. Tropical Storm Jose formed in the open Atlantic on August 29 and remained far from land.

The quick pace of storm formation continued into September, the climatological peak of the hurricane season. On September 1, Tropical Storm Katia formed northwest of Cabo Verde in the far eastern Atlantic. After Gert and Katia dissipated, Tropical Storm Lee formed in the central tropical Atlantic on September 5. It became a hurricane a day later, then rapidly intensified to Category 5 strength northeast of the Leeward Islands, with its winds increasing by 80 mph (130 km/h) during the 24‑hour period ending at 06:00 UTC on September 8. Lee later made multiple landfalls in Atlantic Canada after becoming an extratropical cyclone on September 16. Tropical Storm Margot formed next, and strengthened into a hurricane on September 11 while moving through the central Atlantic. They were joined by Hurricane Nigel, which formed midway between the Lesser Antilles and Cabo Verde Islands on September 15. Nigel remained far from any land masses, and became extratropical on September 22. That same day, Tropical Storm Ophelia formed offshore North Carolina. The storm moved inland the following morning at near-hurricane strength. Also on September 23, Tropical Storm Philippe formed in the eastern tropical Atlantic. Philippe remained a tropical cyclone until October 6, making it the longest-lasting system of the 2023 season. On September 28, Tropical Storm Rina developed well east of the Lesser Antilles. At that time, Philippe and Rina were approximately 620 mi (1,000 km) apart, which is close enough to influence each other's movement and development.

After a brief letup in activity, Tropical Storm Sean developed in the eastern tropical Atlantic on October 11. Later, on October 18, Hurricane Tammy formed. Tammy made landfall on Barbuda, the second system in three weeks to do so, in addition to Philippe. A few days later, short-lived Tropical Depression Twenty-One formed offshore Nicaragua, moved inland, and soon dissipated. The season effectively ended when Tammy transitioned into a remnant low on October 29. No tropical cyclones formed in the Atlantic in the month of November, although a tropical disturbance over the Caribbean Sea was briefly designated as a potential tropical cyclone.

== Systems ==
=== Unnamed subtropical storm (01L) ===
- Subtropical storm (SSHWS)
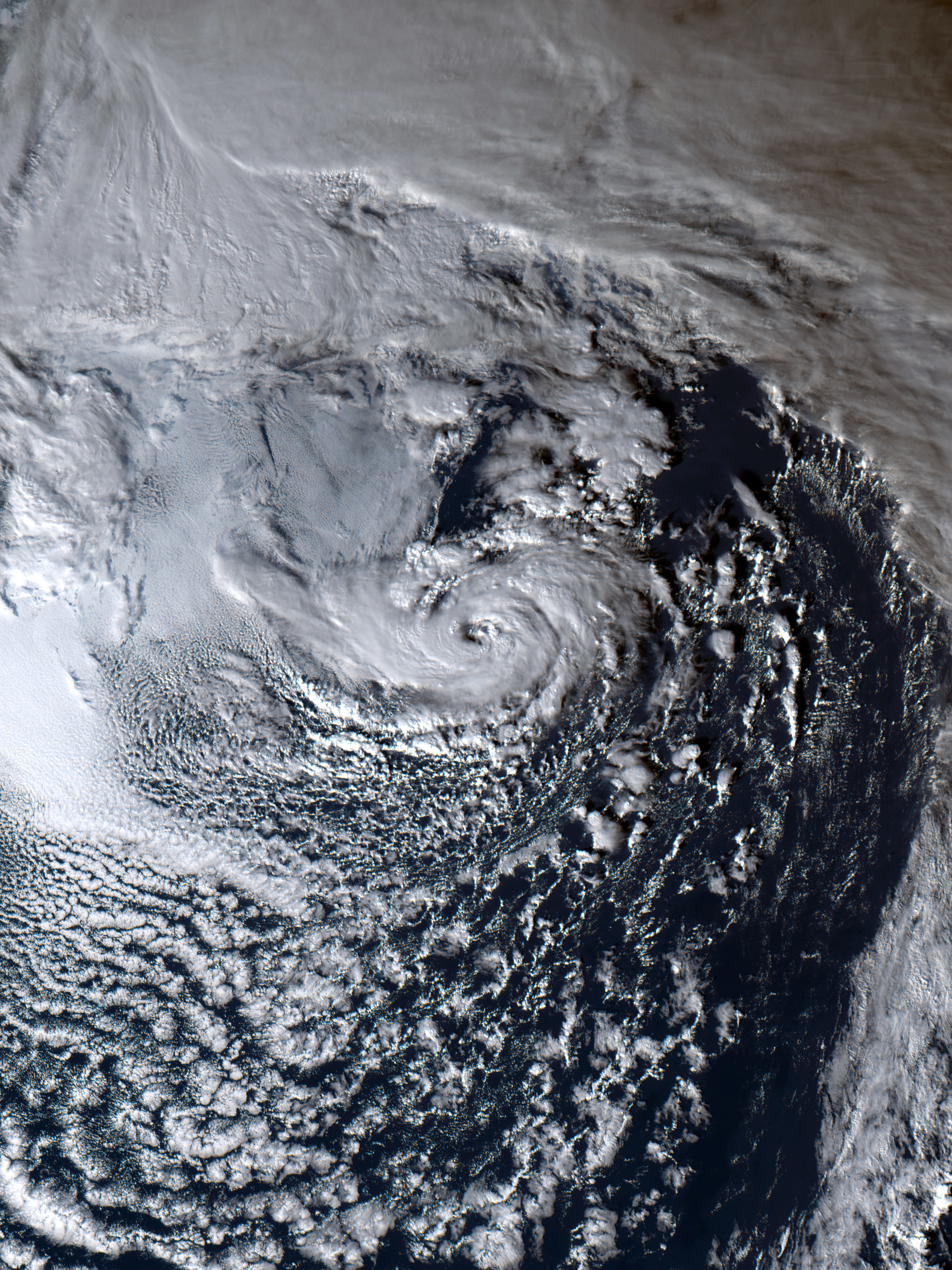
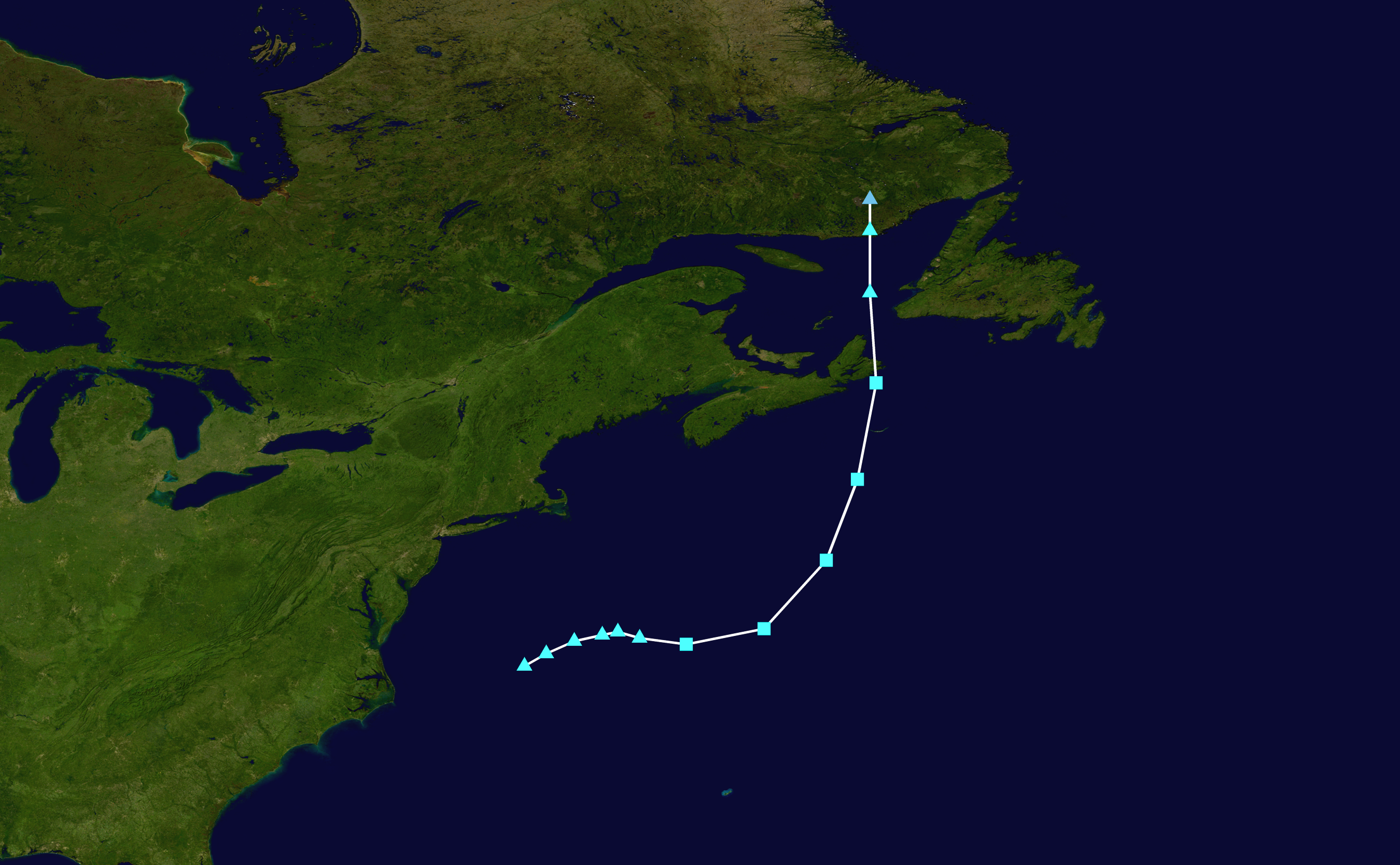
- Duration: January 16 – January 17
- Peak intensity: 70 mph (110 km/h) (1-min); 976 mbar (hPa)

An amplified mid-latitude deep-layer trough moved offshore the East Coast of the United States on January 14. After becoming cutoff from polar flow to the north, the trough decelerated and developed some convection, due to cold air aloft resulting in high atmospheric instability and sea surface temperatures around 68–70 °F (20–21 °C) over the Gulf Stream. A non-tropical low-pressure area formed on January 15. Although the NHC assessed the system as unlikely to transition into a tropical or subtropical cyclone in their special tropical weather outlook issued on the following day, it became a subtropical storm around 12:00 UTC about 345 mi (555 km) southeast of Nantucket, Massachusetts, with sustained winds of 60 mph (95 km/h). The system then intensified, peaking with maximum sustained winds of 70 mph (110 km/h) early on January 17. Thereafter, some weakening occurred as the cyclone moved away from the Gulf Stream. At 12:45 UTC on January 17, it made landfall at Louisbourg, Nova Scotia, with winds of 50 mph (85 km/h), then soon became a post-tropical low, before dissipating over far eastern Quebec the next day. While the system was initially not declared to be a subtropical cyclone, NHC reanalysis on May 11 found it briefly attained subtropical cyclone status.

The most intense winds related to the storm remained offshore, limiting impacts on land. The subtropical storm was located within a broader storm system that brought snowfall to parts of coastal New England, including up to 4.5 in (11 cm) in portions of Massachusetts, with 3.5 in (8.9 cm) of snow in Boston. Wind gusts ranging from 45–55 mph (75–90 km/h) occurred in eastern Plymouth County, downing some trees. In Nova Scotia, the storm brought wind gusts of near 68 mph (110 km/h) to Sable Island.

=== Tropical Storm Arlene ===
- Tropical storm (SSHWS)
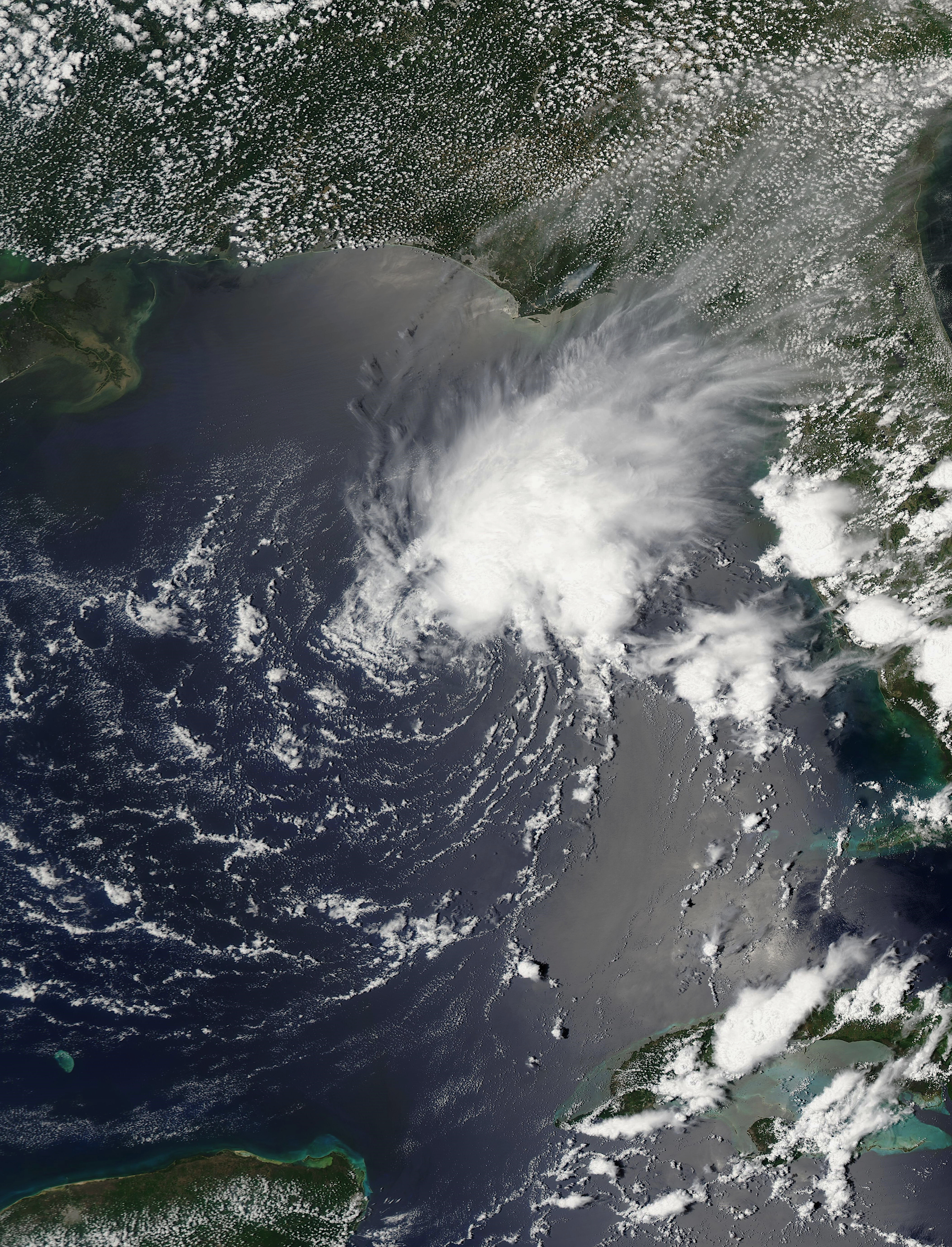
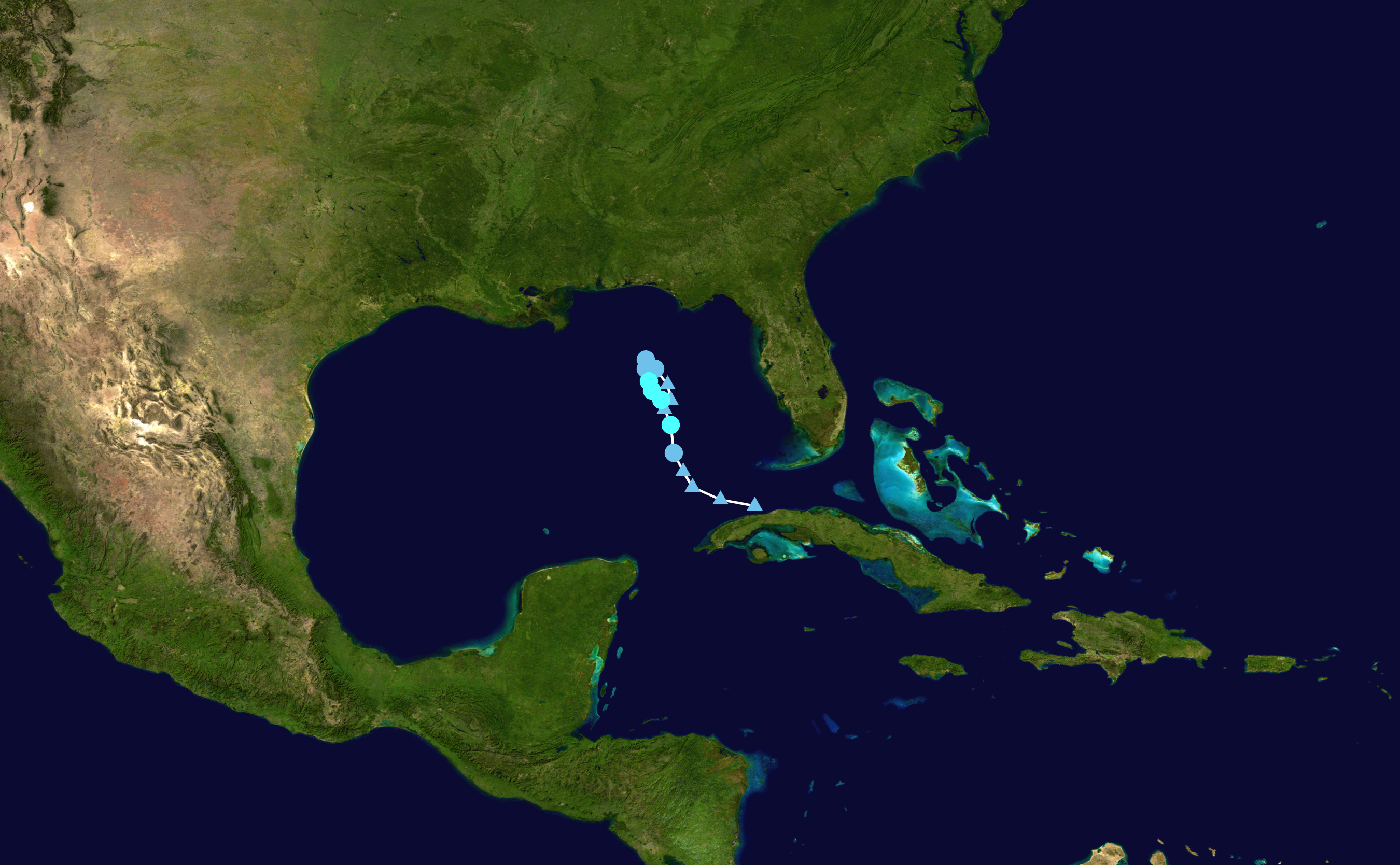
- Duration: June 1 – June 3
- Peak intensity: 40 mph (65 km/h) (1-min); 998 mbar (hPa)

On May 30, the NHC began monitoring an area of disturbed weather over the eastern Gulf of Mexico for possible tropical development. Convection associated with this disturbance, a non-tropical mid- to upper-level trough, spawned a surface low on the following day. The system organized into Tropical Depression Two at 12:00 UTC on June 1 approximately 140 mi (225 km) south-southwest of Cape San Blas, Florida. Hurricane hunters investigated the depression on the morning of June 2, and determined that it had strengthened into Tropical Storm Arlene. Moving southward, Arlene remained a minimal tropical storm throughout the day with sustained winds of 40 mph (65 km/h). At 06:00 UTC on June 3, it weakened to a tropical depression, six hours before degenerating into a remnant low about 220 mi (355 km) west of Key West, Florida. The low subsequently dissipated north of Cuba the next day.

Arlene brought 2–6 in (51–152 mm) of rainfall to many locations in Central and South Florida, including a peak total of 9.82 in (249 mm) in Lakeland. However, this precipitation was mostly beneficial, alleviating drought conditions along with other rains that week. The remnants of Arlene generated severe thunderstorms across Southern Florida, with wind gusts up to 83 mph (134 km/h) at the Fort Lauderdale–Hollywood International Airport. Nearby, winds caused the partial roof collapse of an apartment building in Pembroke Park, forcing two families to evacuate. Damage from this incident totaled $50,000. The remnants of Arlene also dropped rainfall on several islands in the Bahamas, peaking at 8.5 in (220 mm) of precipitation in Cockburn Town.

=== Tropical Storm Bret ===
- Tropical storm (SSHWS)
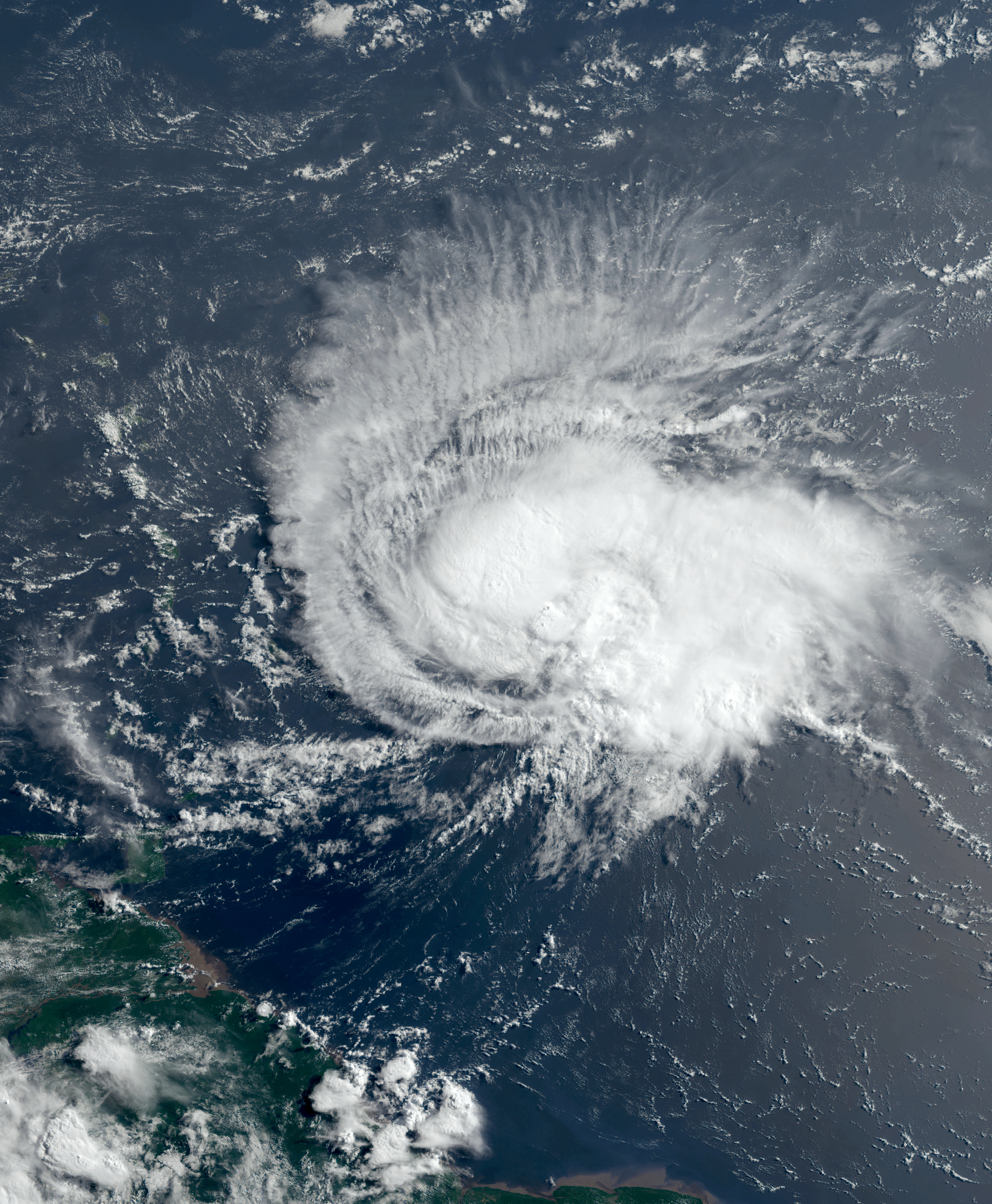
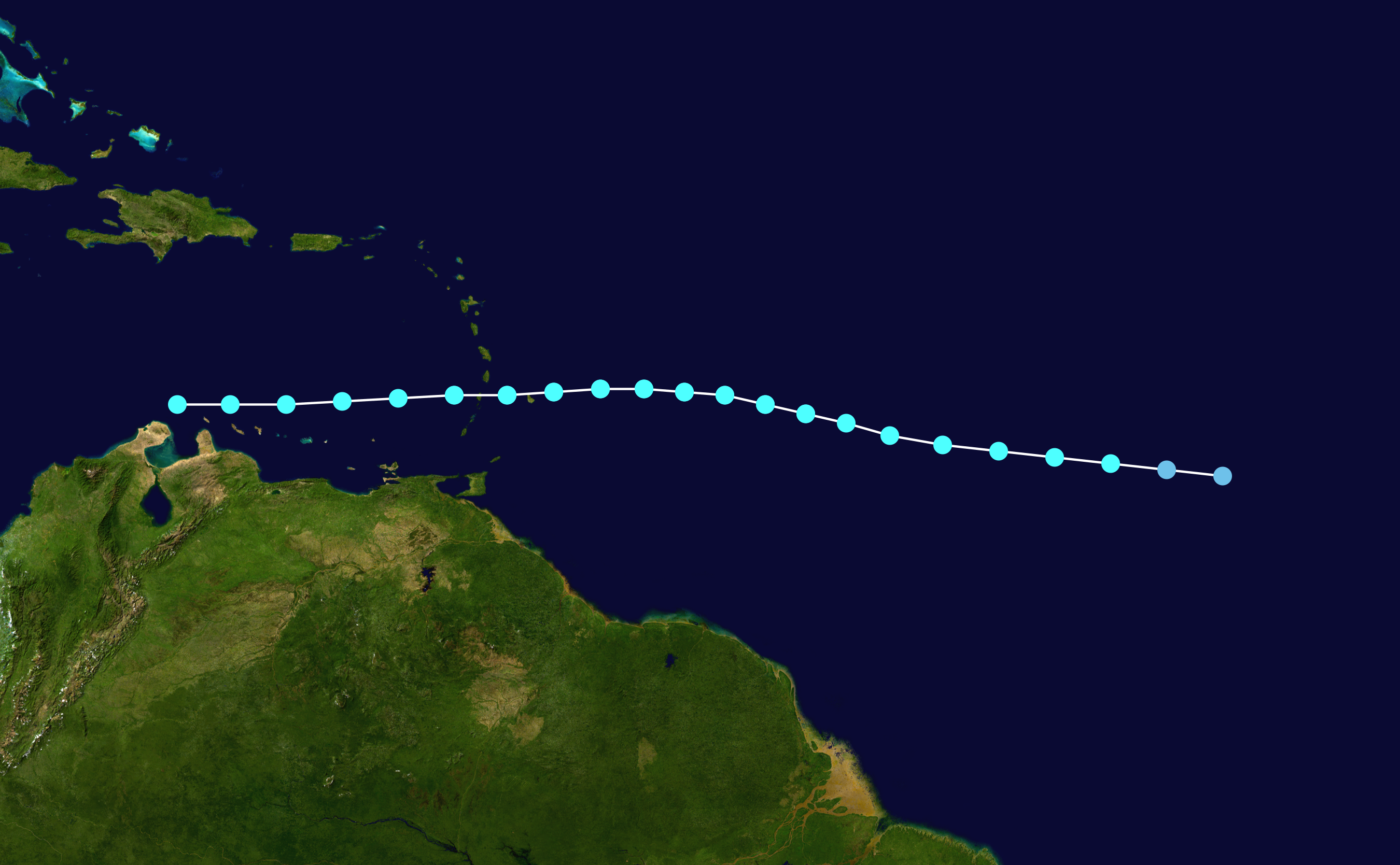
- Duration: June 19 – June 24
- Peak intensity: 70 mph (110 km/h) (1-min); 996 mbar (hPa)

On June 15, a tropical wave moved off the coast of West Africa and emerged into the Atlantic. Warm sea surface temperatures and favorable atmospheric conditions allowed the disturbance to organize into Tropical Depression Three about 1,495 mi (2,410 km) east of Barbados early on June 19 and strengthen into Tropical Storm Bret that afternoon. Gradual intensification occurred during the next couple of days as it headed west towards the Lesser Antilles. Hurricane hunters investigated Bret early on June 22 and found sustained winds of 70 mph (110 km/h) and a central pressure of 996 mbar (29.4 inHg). Soon after, increasing wind shear began weakening the storm. Early on June 24, Bret passed just to the north of Aruba, Bonaire, and Curaçao with an exposed low-level center, and opened into a trough near the Guajira Peninsula of Colombia around 12:00 UTC. The remnant wave later crossed Central America and contributed to the formation of Hurricane Beatriz.

Bret brought gusty winds and heavy rains to the Windward Islands, damaging 17 homes and the roofs of 35 other structures. Hewanorra International Airport on Saint Lucia reported a wind gust of 69 mph (111 km/h) on the morning of June 23, and officials reported that much of the island's electrical grid had been knocked out by the storm. Tropical storm-force winds damaged several buildings on Barbados, including a tree falling onto a home in Bridgetown. The country's Grantley Adams International Airport reported a peak wind gust of 56 mph (90 km/h). The passing storm also damaged or destroyed several homes in Saint Vincent and the Grenadines, with 50% of the island losing power. Agricultural losses from the storm on Saint Lucia were $445,000.

=== Tropical Storm Cindy ===
- Tropical storm (SSHWS)
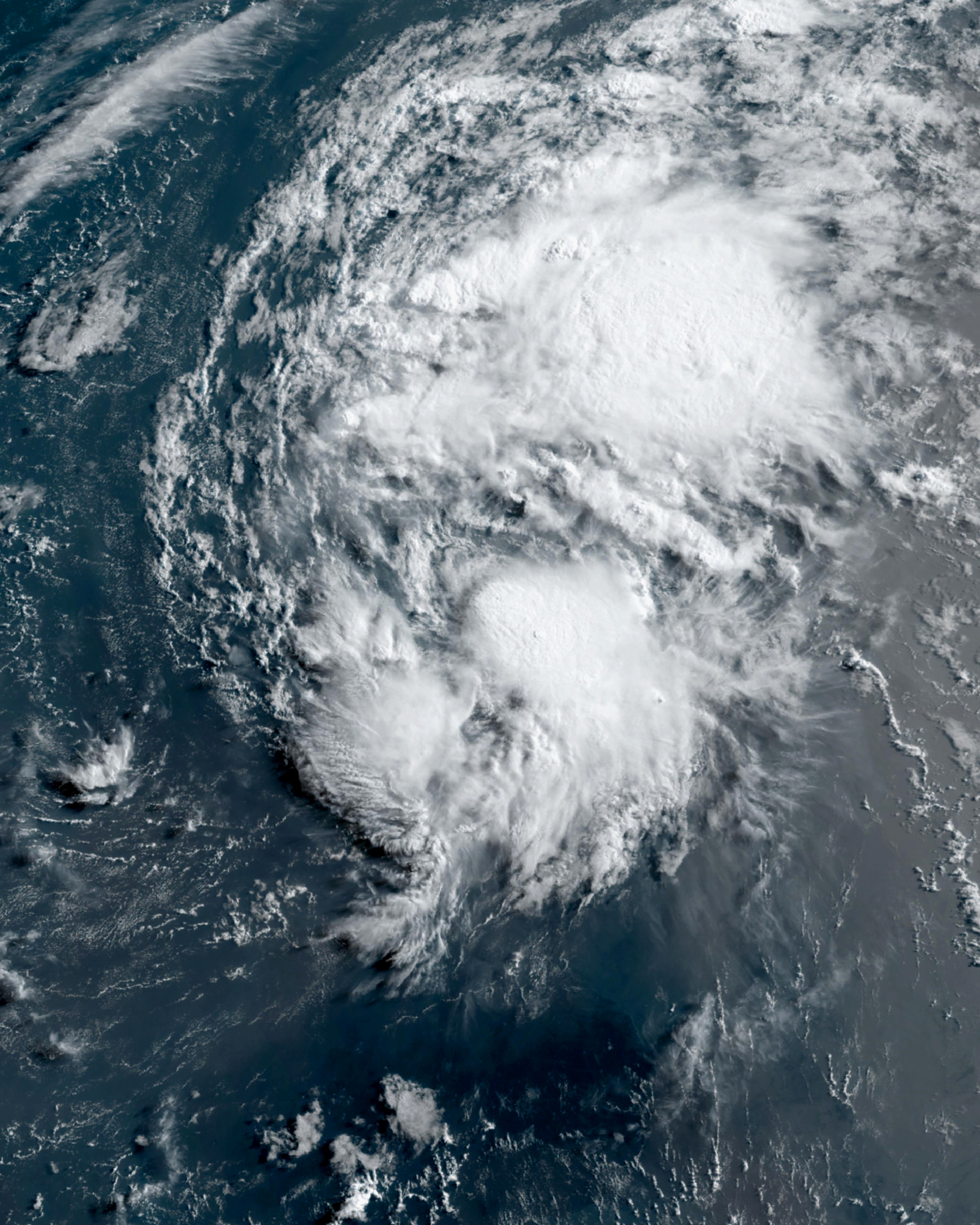
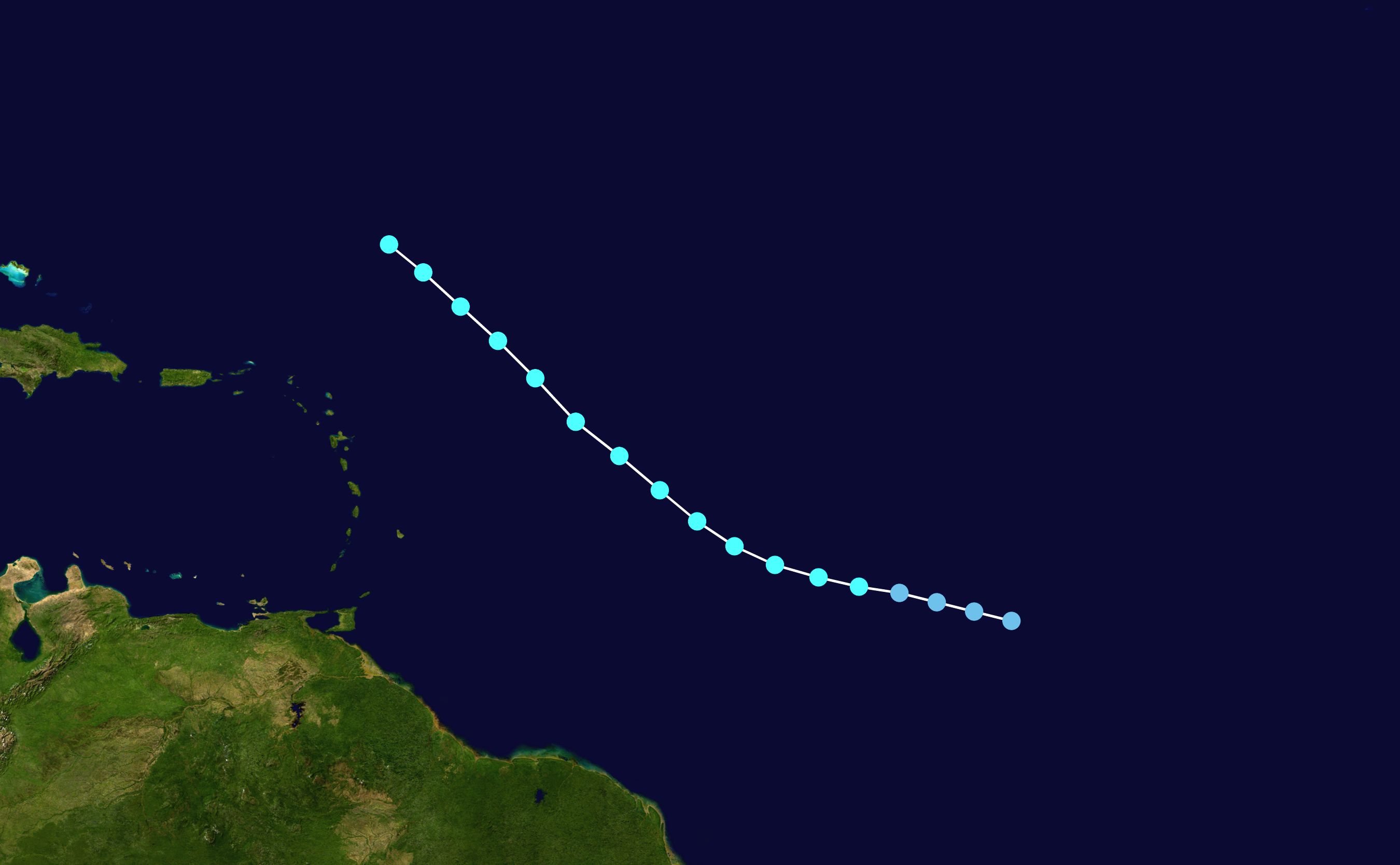
- Duration: June 22 – June 26
- Peak intensity: 60 mph (95 km/h) (1-min); 1004 mbar (hPa)

On June 18, the NHC began tracking a tropical wave that had recently moved off the coast of West Africa, which became more organized the next day. Though the system initially struggled to become better organized, it was in an environment overall conducive to development, and organized into Tropical Depression Four on the morning of June 22, while about 1,395 mi (2,245 km) east of the Lesser Antilles. Despite marginal atmospheric conditions, the depression strengthened into Tropical Storm Cindy early the next day. At 12:00 UTC on June 24, Cindy's sustained winds intensified to 60 mph (95 km/h), based on reconnaissance flight and satellite estimates. But later that day and continuing into the next, the storm grew progressively weaker. Then, at 06:00 UTC on June 26, Cindy dissipated about 375 mi (605 km) north-northeast of the Northern Leeward Islands.

=== Hurricane Don ===
- Category 1 hurricane (SSHWS)
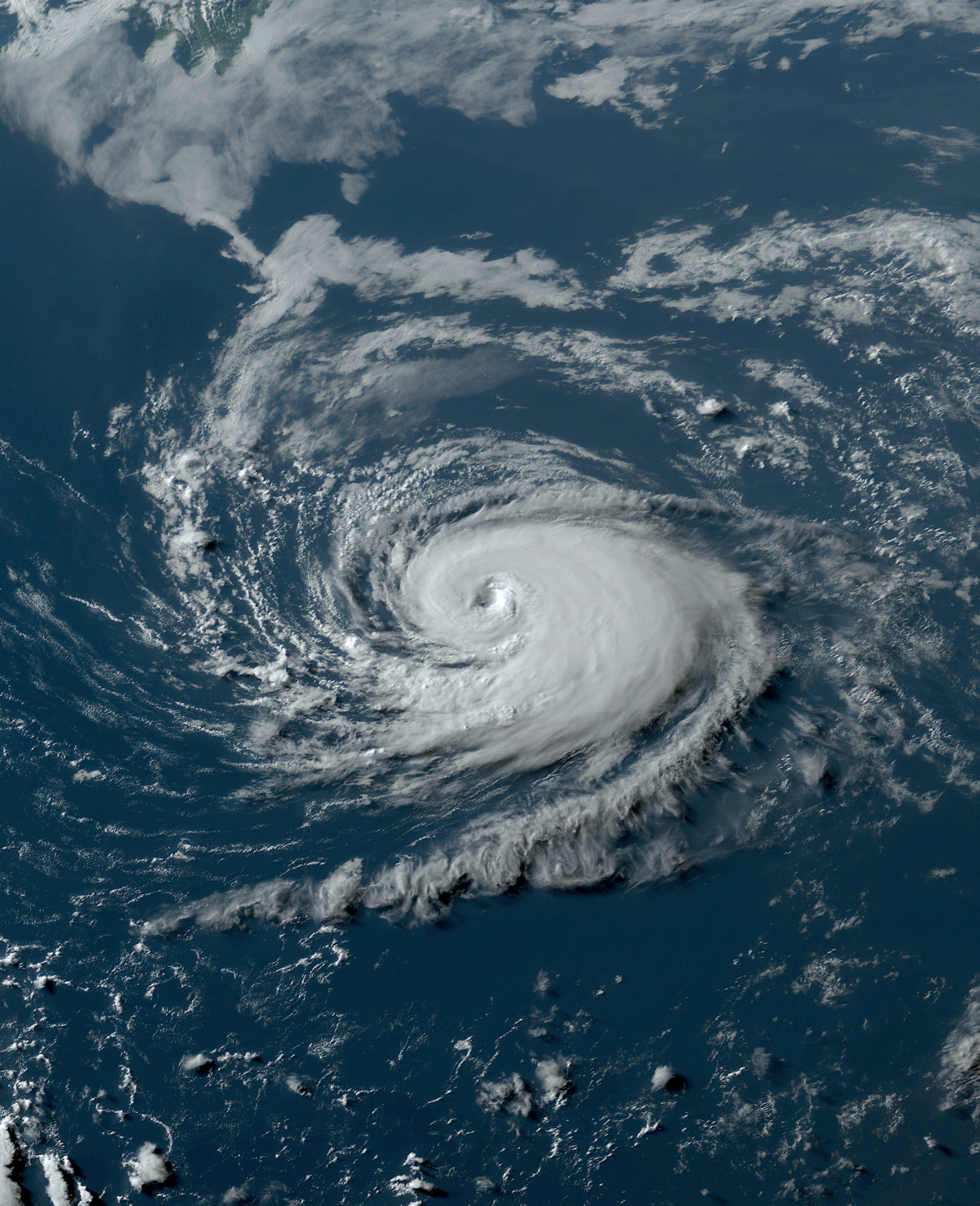
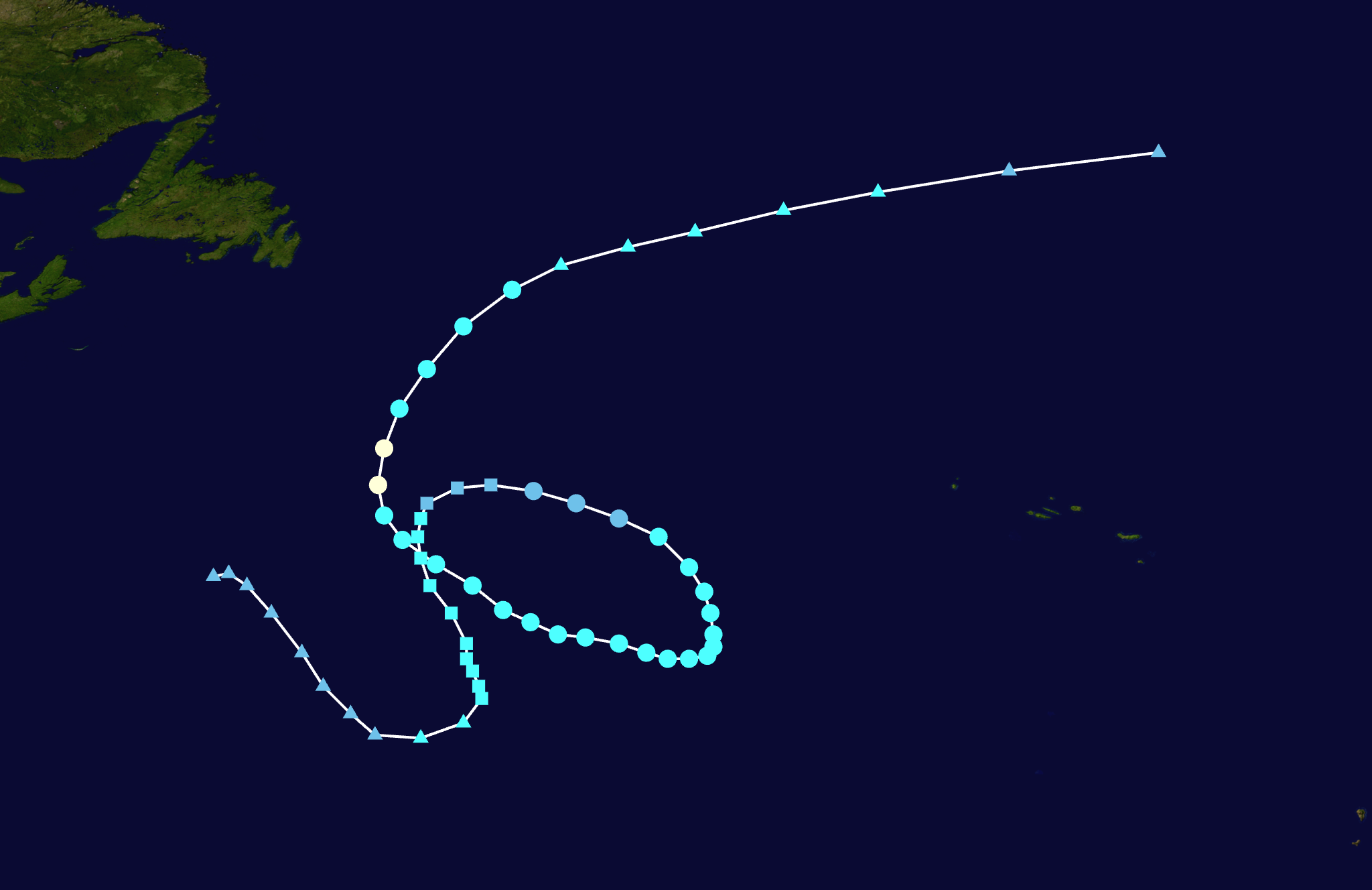
- Duration: July 14 – July 24
- Peak intensity: 75 mph (120 km/h) (1-min); 986 mbar (hPa)

A trough of low pressure formed over the central Atlantic on July 11, east-northeast of Bermuda. Though the system remained embedded within the trough and had not acquired a compact wind field, a well-defined center of circulation developed along with persistent deep convection early on July 14. Consequently, Subtropical Storm Don formed around then about 1,050 mi (1,690 km) east-northeast of Bermuda. Don's deep convection decreased later that day, and it weakened to a subtropical depression on July 16. The next day, while beginning an anticyclonic loop over the central Atlantic, steered by a blocking ridge to its north, the system transitioned to a tropical depression, based on Don's wind field and convective core becoming more consolidated. Based on satellite wind data, intensified into a tropical storm early on July 18. A few days later, while moving over the Gulf Stream on July 22, the storm quickly strengthened into a Category 1 hurricane with sustained winds of 75 mph (120 km/h). Don remained a minimal hurricane for several hours before weakening to a tropical storm early on July 23, when its structure quickly deteriorated as it moved over increasingly cooler waters north of the Gulf Stream. While situated about 400 mi (645 km) east of Newfoundland early on July 24, Don degenerated into a non-tropical low, which continued east-northeastward across the Atlantic and transitioned into an extratropical cyclone late on the next day.

=== Tropical Storm Gert ===
- Tropical storm (SSHWS)
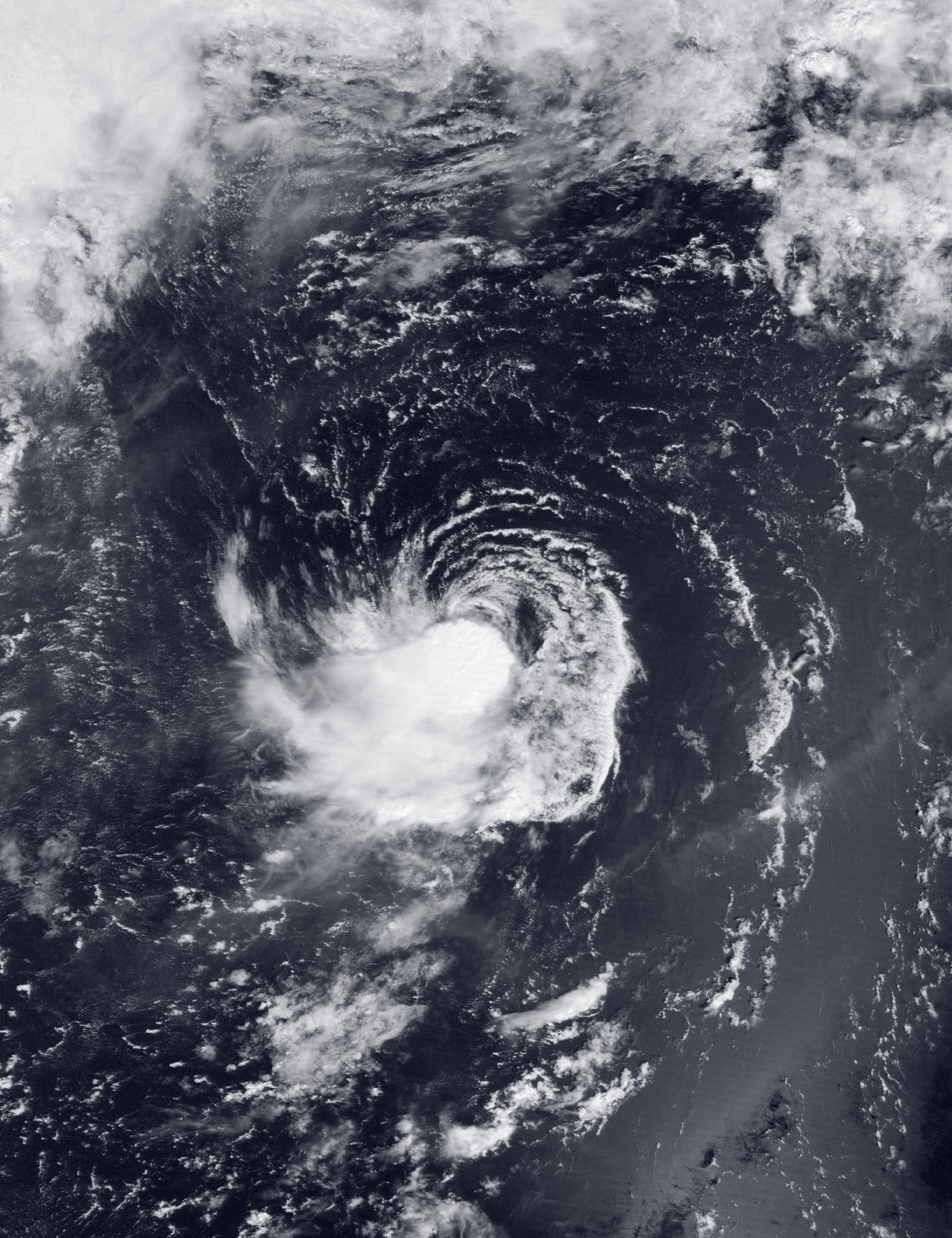
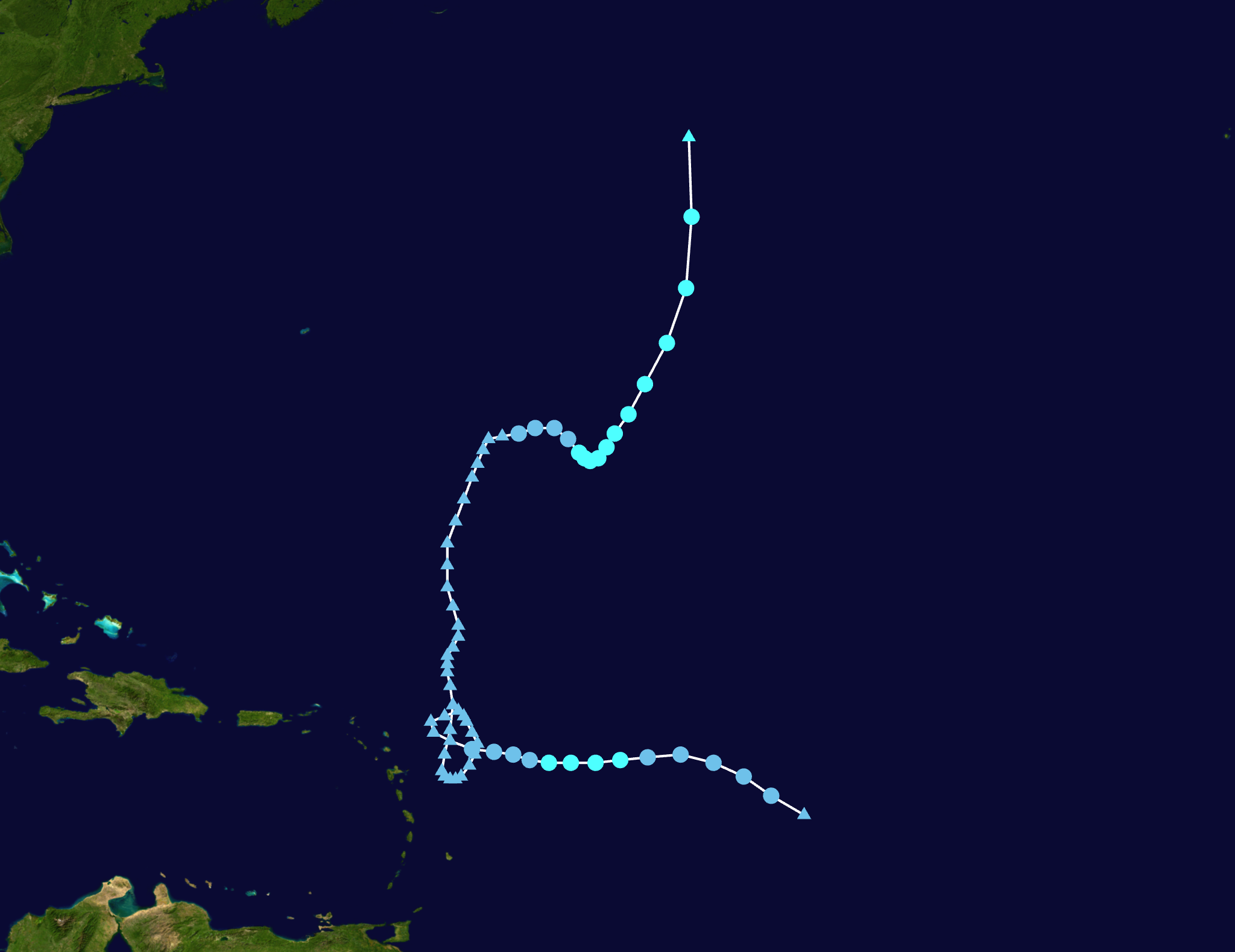
- Duration: August 19 – September 4
- Peak intensity: 60 mph (95 km/h) (1-min); 998 mbar (hPa)

A tropical wave emerged into the Atlantic from the west coast of Africa on August 14. The system struggled to organize amid conditions only marginally favorable while moving west-northwestward. By early on August 19, a low formed, which quickly organized into Tropical Depression Six about 875 mi (1,410 km) east of the Lesser Antilles. Despite battling high vertical wind shear, the depression intensified into Tropical Storm Gert on August 20. Wind shear soon increased further, however, from the outflow of nearby Franklin, weakening Gert to a tropical depression by the next day. It subsequently lost deep convection and on August 22, Gert degenerated into a remnant low. The low eventually opened up into a trough, but the remnants remained identifiable over the next week as the system trekked slowly northward into the central Atlantic.

Early on August 30, NHC began monitoring the remnants of Gert for potential redevelopment. The remnant low again became well-defined, and the system regenerated into Tropical Depression Gert around 18:00 UTC on August 31. Gert continued its rebound, becoming a tropical storm once again about 24 hours later. Moving north-northeastward, its winds reached 60 mph (95 km/h) early on September 3, an intensification achieved in spite of strong northeasterly wind shear. However, Gert began deteriorating several hours later while being drawn quickly northward and degenerated into a remnant low on September 4 about 515 mi (830 km) south-southeast of Cape Race, Newfoundland, shortly before being absorbed into the larger circulation of Post-Tropical Cyclone Idalia.

=== Tropical Storm Emily ===
- Tropical storm (SSHWS)
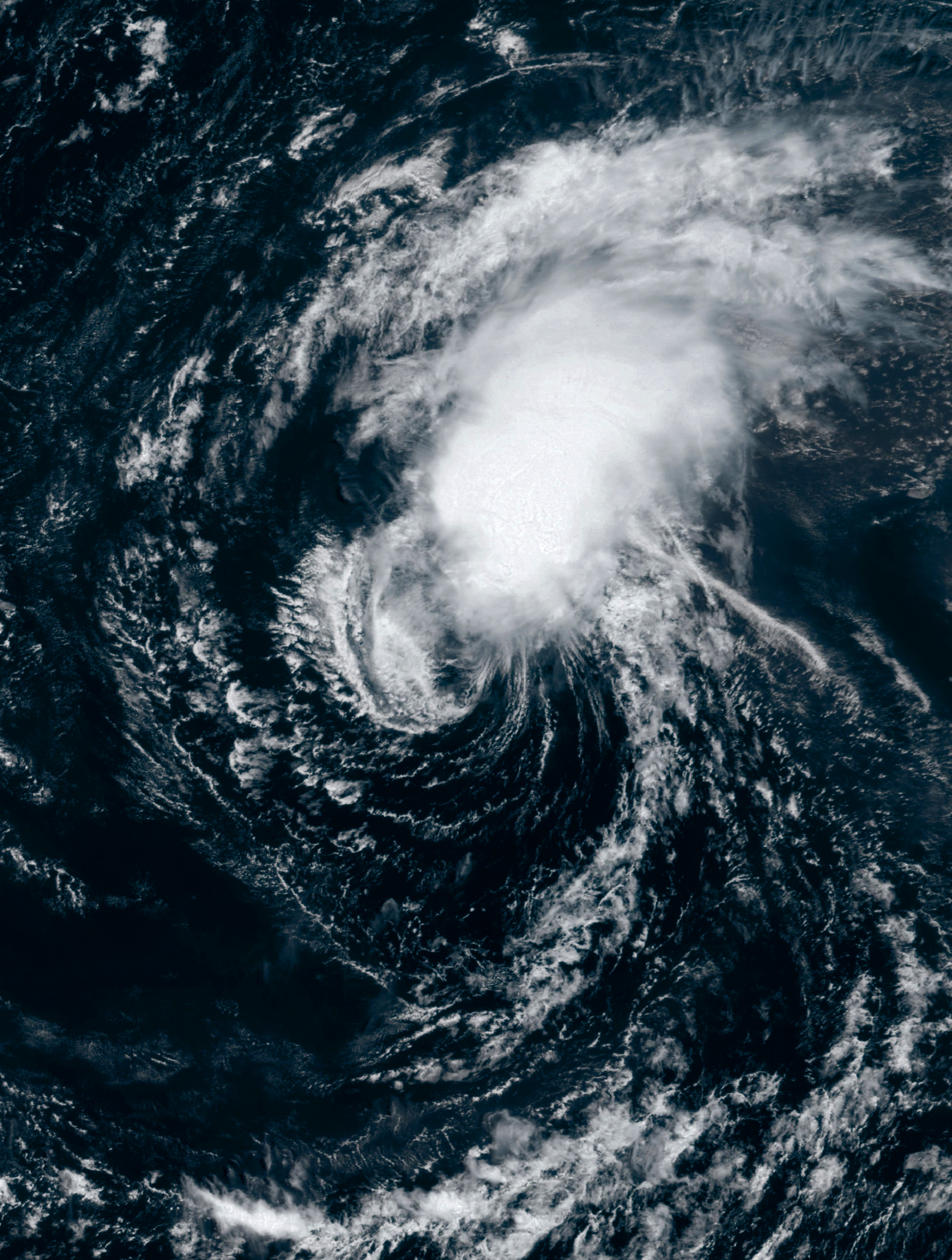
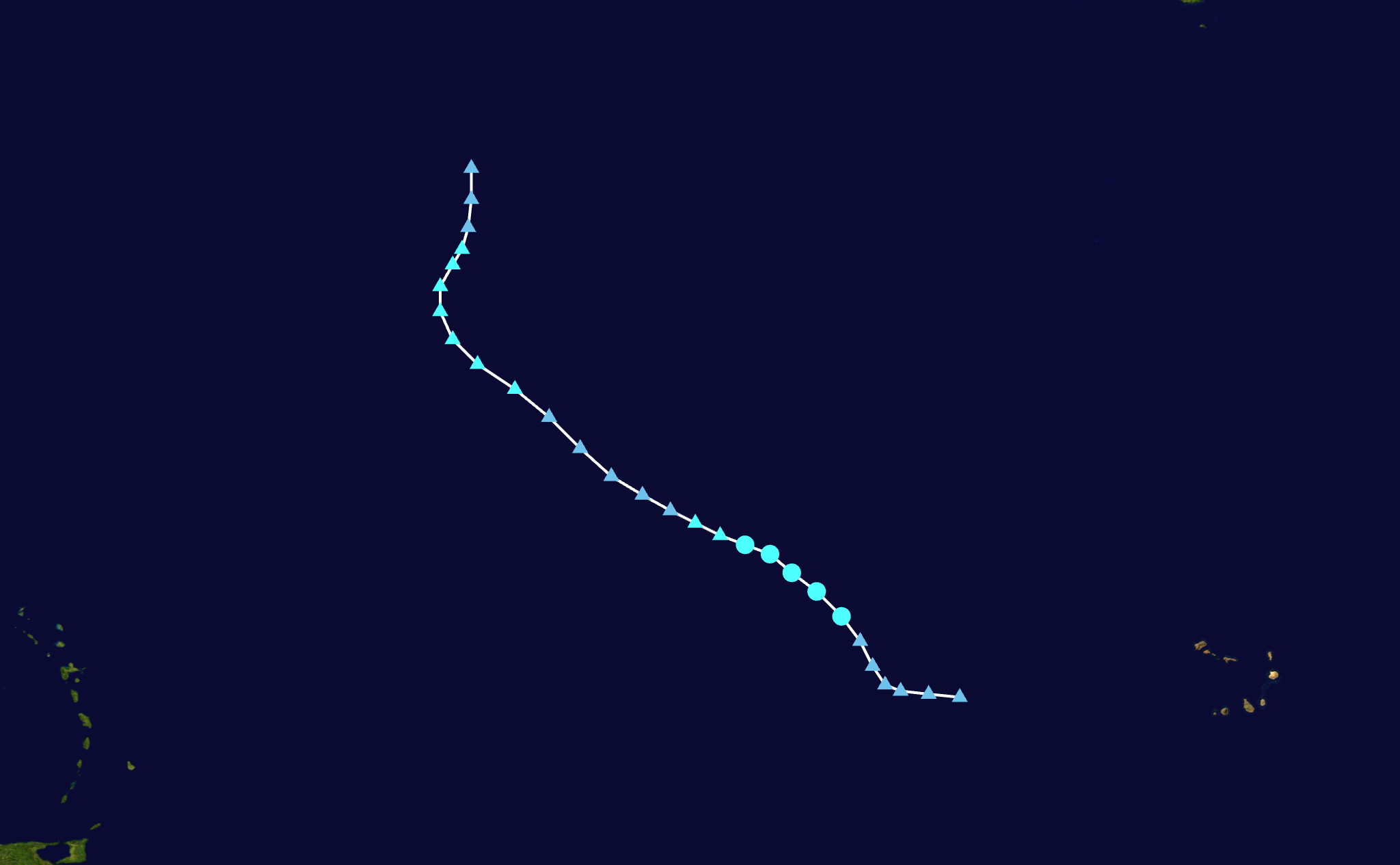
- Duration: August 20 – August 21
- Peak intensity: 50 mph (85 km/h) (1-min); 998 mbar (hPa)

On August 16, a tropical wave emerged into the Atlantic from the west coast of Africa and traversed the Cabo Verde Islands on the next day. Over the next few days, the system gradually organized under generally favorable conditions. On August 20, satellite wind data indicated that it was producing gale-force winds in its northern side, and the center became well-defined. Consequently, the disturbance developed into Tropical Storm Emily that day approximately 750 mi (1,205 km) west of the northernmost islands of Cabo Verde. Around 12:00 UTC on August 20, the storm peaked with winds of 50 mph (85 km/h) and a minimum pressure of 998 mbar (29.5 inHg). However, Emily was soon affected by high wind shear and a dry environment, leaving its center exposed and eventually devoid of convection altogether. As a result, the cyclone degenerated into a remnant low early on August 21. However, the NHC continued to monitor the system for the chance of it redeveloping. The system showed some signs of reorganization as it moved through the subtropical Atlantic, but failed to organize further and dissipated on August 25.

=== Hurricane Franklin ===
- Category 4 hurricane (SSHWS)
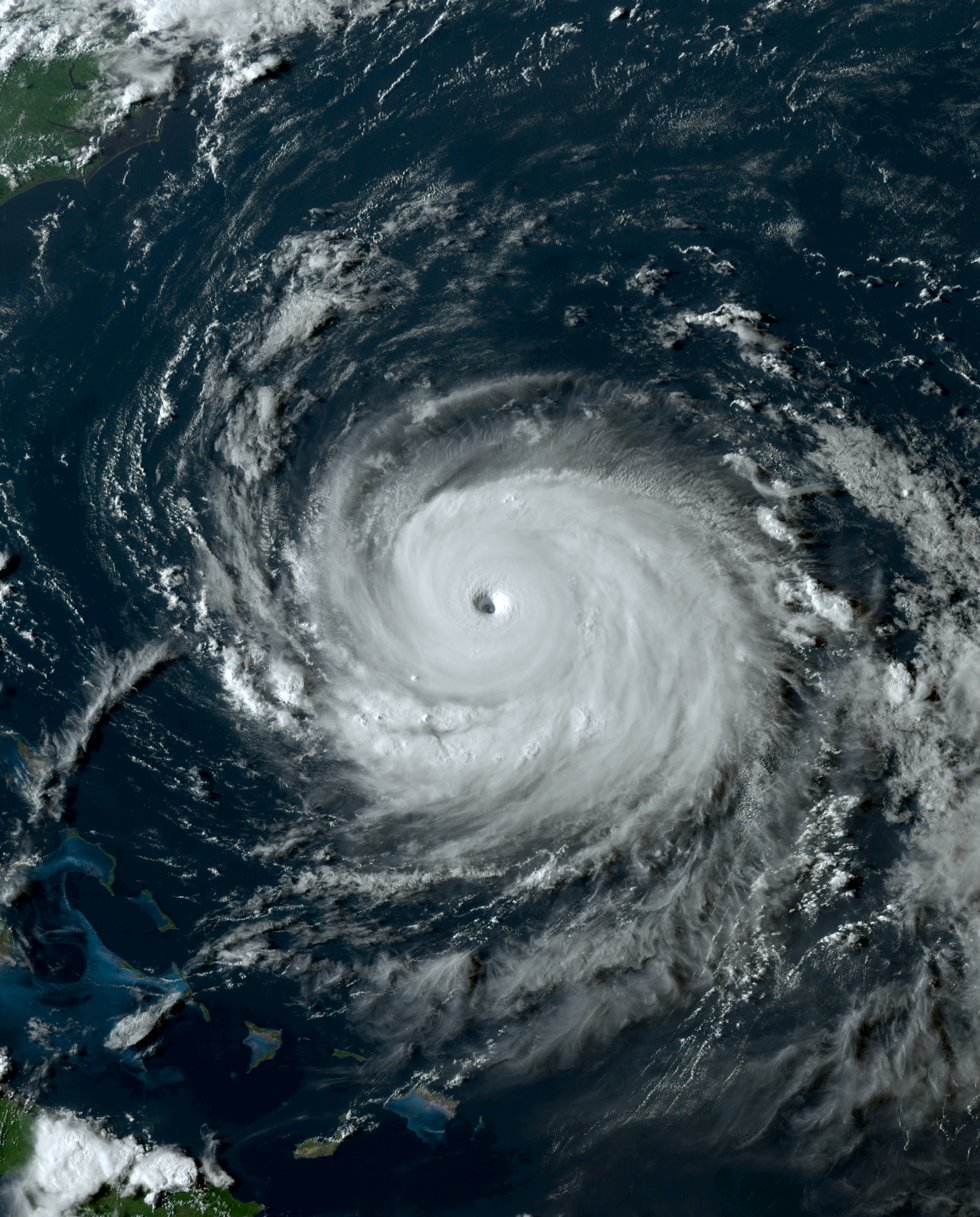
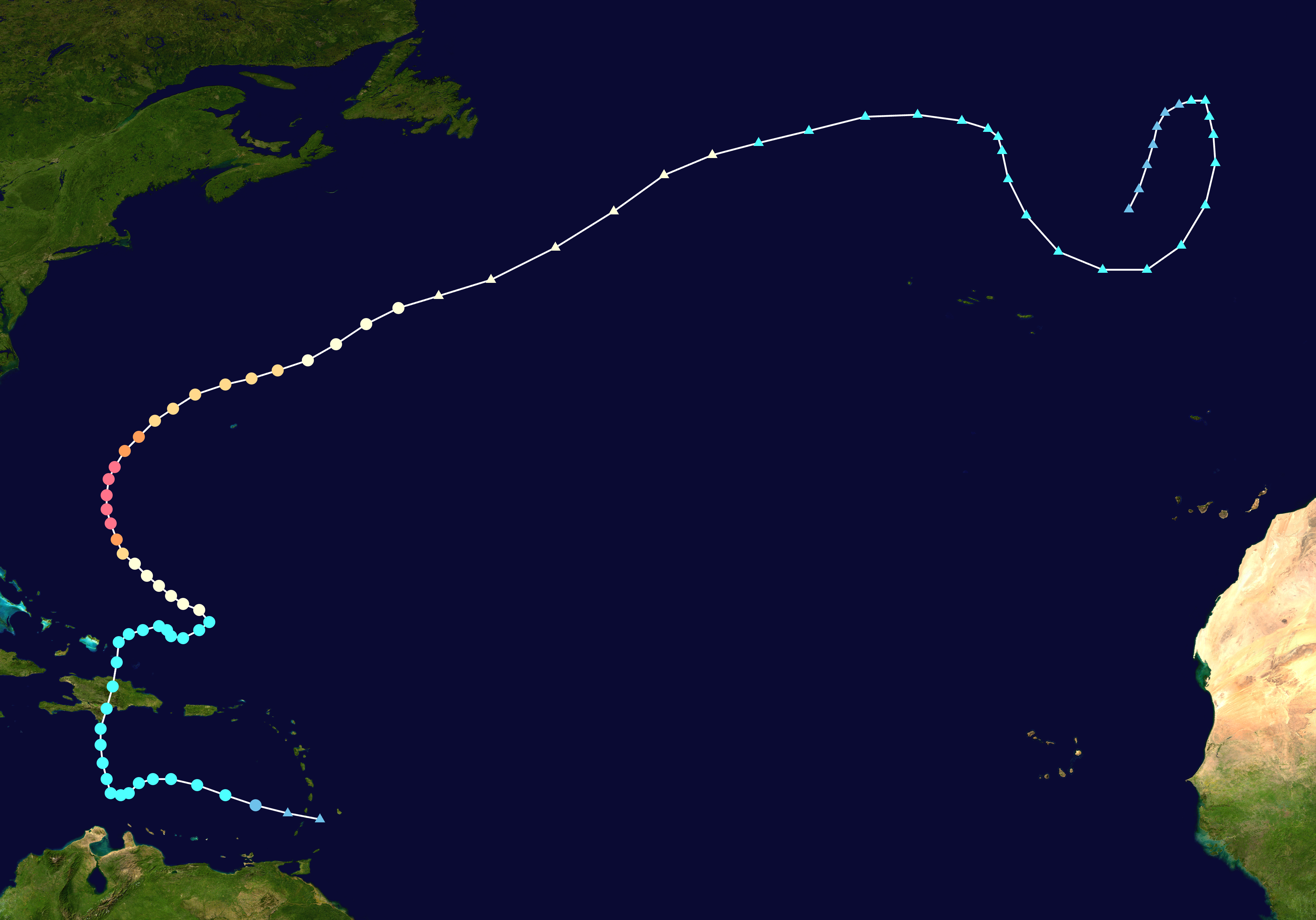
- Duration: August 20 – September 1
- Peak intensity: 150 mph (240 km/h) (1-min); 926 mbar (hPa)

A disturbance within a monsoonal trough developed into a low-pressure area over Windward Islands on August 19, possibly due to a weak tropical wave. The low quickly organized further, becoming a tropical depression over the eastern Caribbean around 06:00 UTC on August 20. Six hours later, the depression intensified into Tropical Storm Franklin. Initially moving west-northwestward due to a subtropical ridge, Franklin moved westward and then southwestward on August 21, by which time it began struggling with increasing wind shear. Franklin became disorganized enough that it became difficult to ascertain if the storm still had a closed circulation. Early on August 23, the storm began moving northwestward before turning northward due to a break in the subtropical ridge while becoming more organized as wind shear lessened. Around 10:00 UTC, Franklin struck Pedernales Province, Dominican Republic, with winds of 45 mph (75 km/h).

Franklin weakened slightly while crossing the Dominican Republic and emerged into the Atlantic later on August 23. After struggling with strong westerly shear and land interaction for a few more days, Franklin entered a more favorable environment on August 25 and promptly intensified into hurricane on August 26 while turning northwestward. Franklin then rapidly strengthened beginning on August 28, with the storm becoming a major hurricane that day, and then peaking as a Category 4 hurricane with winds of 150 mph (240 km/h) early on August 29. However, the system then weakened due to an eyewall replacement cycle and wind shear from the outflow of Idalia. Later that day, Franklin turned east-northeastward and passed north of Bermuda. While doing so, the storm's eye structure began to deteriorate due to strong northerly wind shear. Then, on September 1, Franklin transitioned into an extratropical cyclone about 720 mi (1,160 km) northeast of Bermuda. Three days later, the NHC discussed the potential for the ex‑Franklin, then located north of the Azores, to regenerate as it was expected to soon move southeastward towards warmer waters. Though some reorganization did take place, the extratropical system dissipated on September 9.

The outer bands of Franklin generally produced precipitation totals of 2 to 4 in (51 to 102 mm) across southern and eastern Puerto Rico, causing mudslides, flash flooding, and overflowing rivers. In the Dominican Republic, Franklin brought heavy rainfall, typically ranging from 6 to 10 in (150 to 250 mm) of precipitation, and wind gusts up to 52 mph (84 km/h) in Barahona. Consequently, damage occurred to buildings, homes, and light posts. At least 350 people were displaced, and more than 500 homes and 2,500 roads were affected or damaged. Several communities became isolated, and nearly 350,000 homes lost electricity and another 1.6 million residents lost access to potable water. The Meteorological Service of the Dominican Republic reported three deaths in the country, while damage throughout the country totaled approximately $90 million. Minor impacts also occurred on Bermuda, mainly limited to power outages.

=== Tropical Storm Harold ===
- Tropical storm (SSHWS)
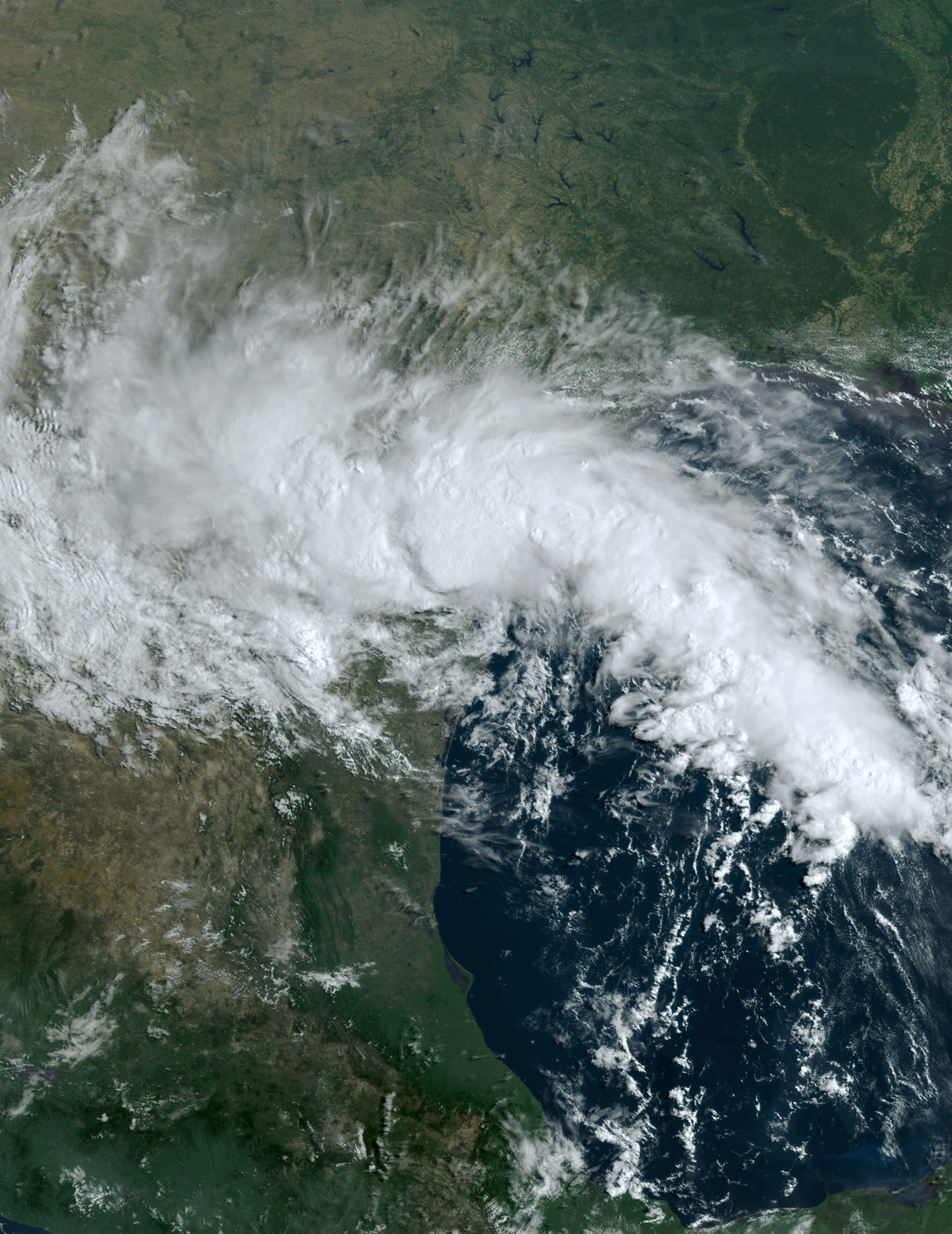
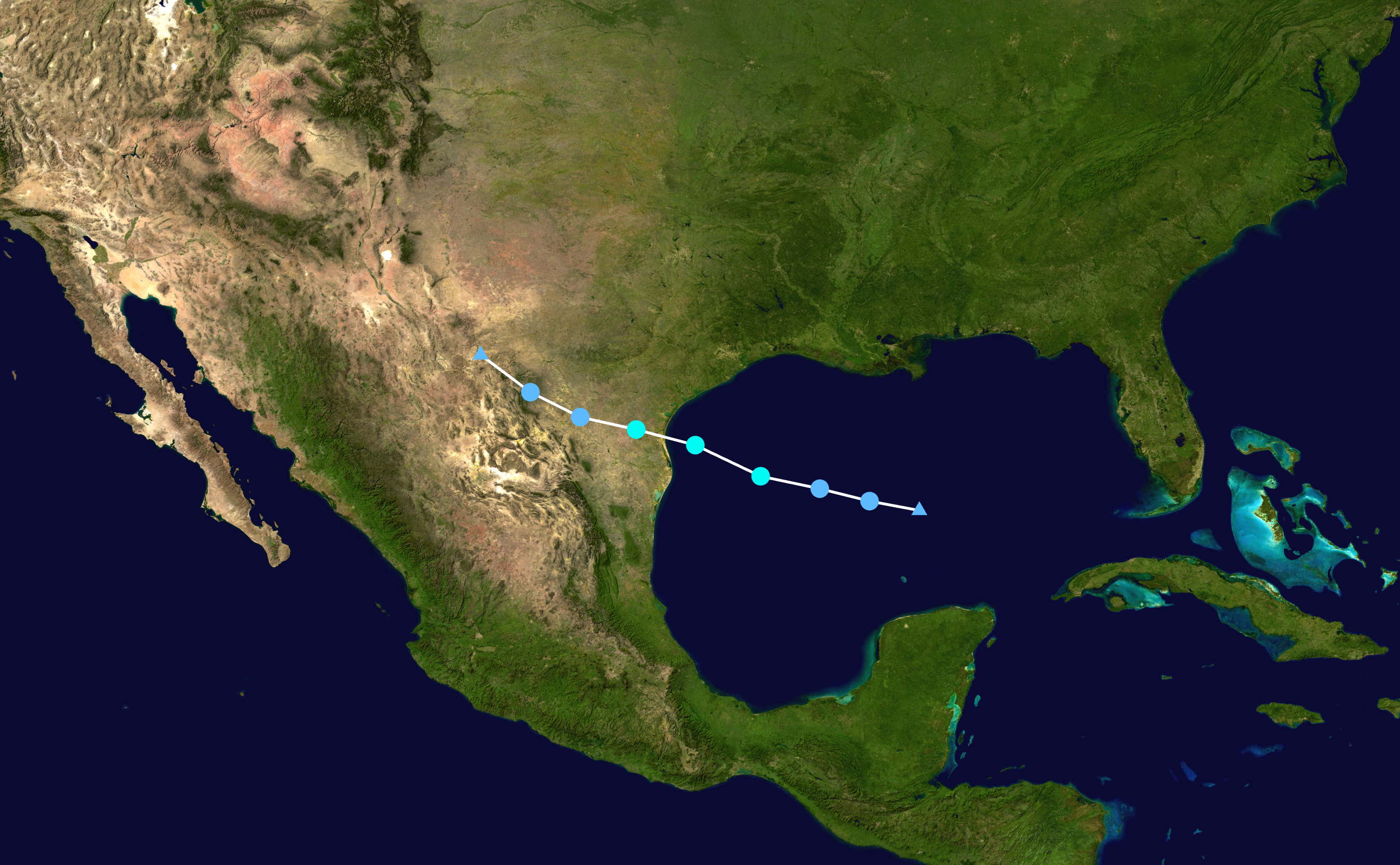
- Duration: August 21 – August 23
- Peak intensity: 60 mph (95 km/h) (1-min); 995 mbar (hPa)

Between August 8 and August 10, a tropical wave exited the west coast of Africa and entered the Atlantic. The wave moved uneventfully westward until August 17, when convective activity increased along its northern axis, then centered north of the Dominican Republic. After crossing the Bahamas, Florida, and the Straits of Florida, the wave entered the Gulf of Mexico on August 20, soon becoming better organized amid near record-warm sea surface temperatures of 86–90 °F (30–32 °C). Late on August 21, the system developed into Tropical Depression Nine about 415 mi (670 km) east of Brownsville, Texas. Moving quickly westward, the depression intensified into Tropical Storm Harold at 06:00 UTC on August 22. Harold strengthened some more before making landfall on Padre Island, in the Texas Coastal Bend region, at around 15:00 UTC that day with maximum sustained winds of 60 mph (95 km/h). About five hours later, it weakened into a tropical depression. Early on August 23, Harold degenerated to a remnant low as its circulation became increasingly ill-defined.

Harold generated modest storm surge in Texas as it approached landfall, reaching 2.2 ft (0.67 m) at San Luis Pass. The storm brought up to 6.98 in (177 mm) of rainfall near Orange Grove, while Corpus Christi broke a daily record with 4.74 in (120 mm) of precipitation on August 22. Tropical storm-force winds also spread across the region, with sustained winds reaching 48 mph (77 km/h) and gusts peaking at 67 mph (108 km/h), both recorded at Loyola Beach. Over 35,000 customers across southern Texas lost power. The London Independent School District was shut down for several days due to damage sustained during the storm. Harold also brought heavy rain and strong winds to parts of northern Mexico, but caused only minor damage. In Piedras Negras, 4 in (100 mm) of rain fell within a few hours. The remnants of Harold brought severe flooding to portions of the American Southwest, including Las Vegas, where one person died and another was reported missing. Overall, Harold caused approximately $505,000 in damage.

=== Hurricane Idalia ===
- Category 4 hurricane (SSHWS)
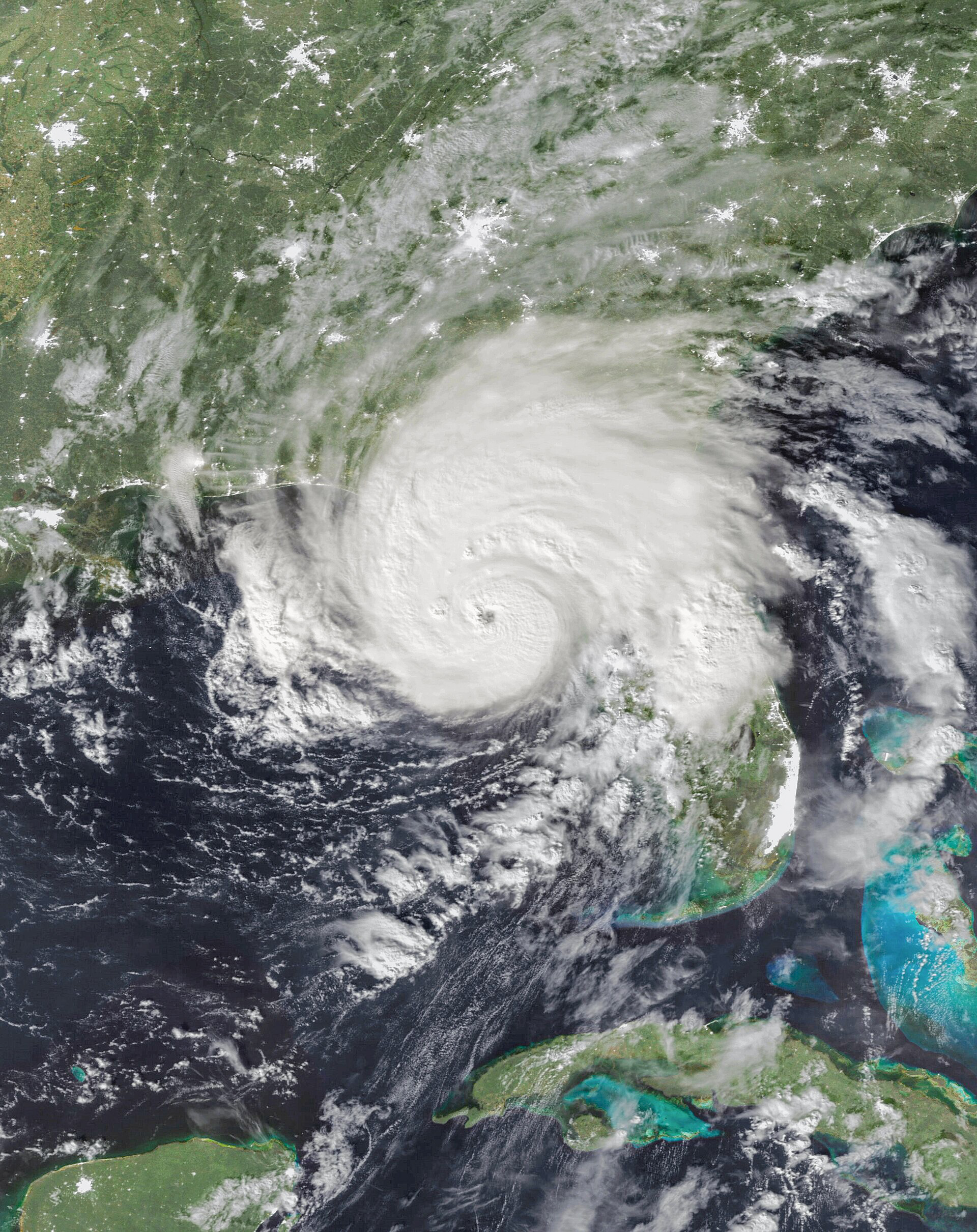
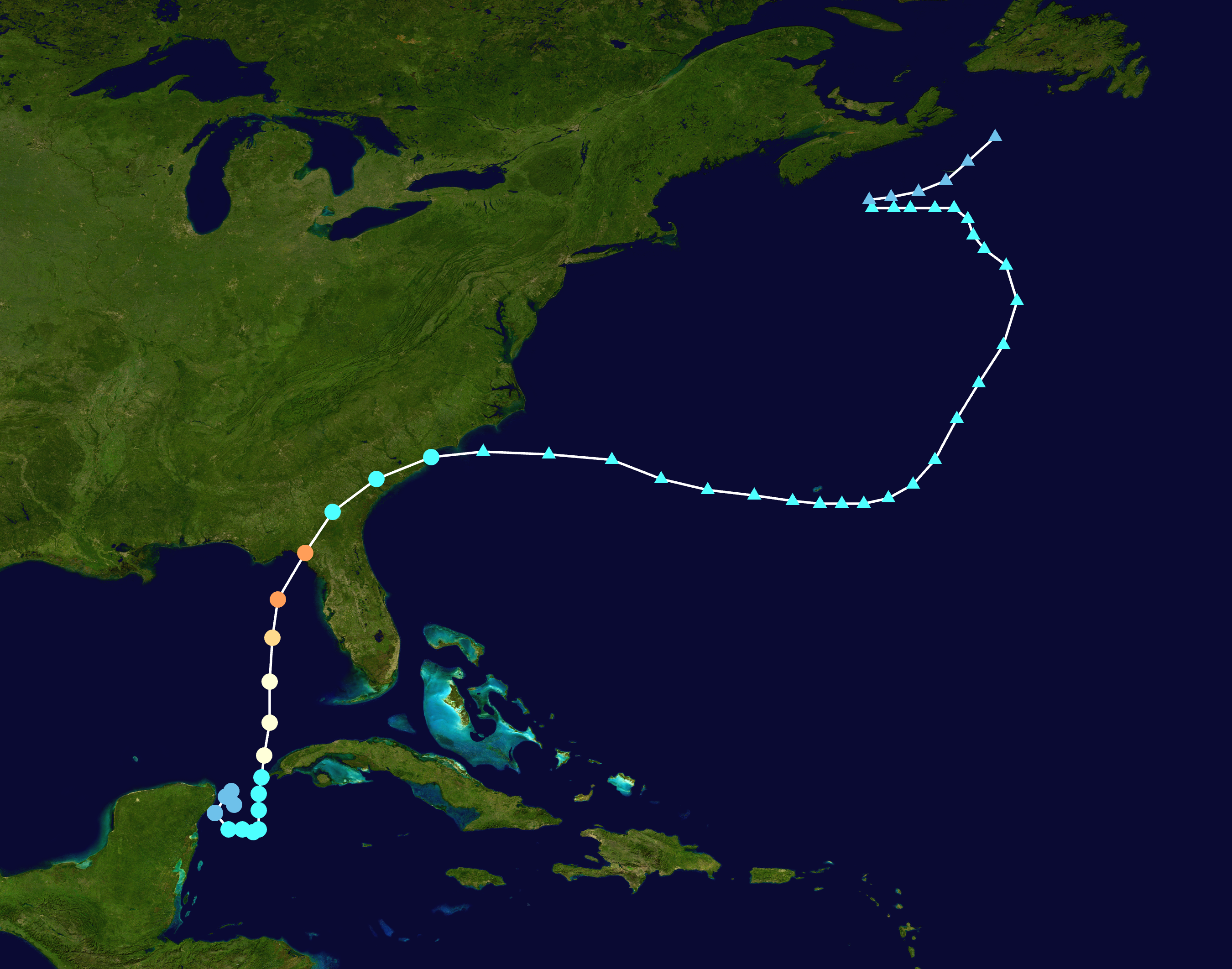
- Duration: August 26 – August 31
- Peak intensity: 130 mph (215 km/h) (1-min); 942 mbar (hPa)

On August 23, a trough of low pressure formed in the Eastern Pacific basin offshore of the Central America coast. The disturbance crossed over into the Atlantic basin and began to organize as it moved northward through the northwestern Caribbean, where a low-pressure area formed on August 25. The pace of organization quickened on August 26, with a tropical depression developing at 12:00 UTC about 45 mi (70 km) east-southeast of Cancún, Mexico. Later that day, and into the next, the depression drifted due to weak surrounding steering currents, with its center moving in a small counter-clockwise loop. A brief jog southward moved the depression over Cancún around 06:00 UTC on August 27. About six hours later, the cyclone intensified into Tropical Storm Idalia. Early on August 28, Idalia began moving northward toward the Yucatán Channel west of Cuba, intensifying along the way. After passing near the western tip of Cuba early the next day, the storm strengthened into a hurricane.

Due to warm sea surface temperatures, low wind shear, and moist air, Idalia rapidly intensified as it accelerated northward through the Gulf of Mexico, reaching Category 4 strength early on August 30 and peaking with maximum sustained winds of 130 mph (215 km/h) and a minimum central pressure of 942 mbar (27.82 inHg). Idalia's strengthening was then halted by an eyewall replacement cycle, which caused it to weaken slightly before it made landfall at 11:45 UTC, near Keaton Beach, Florida, with sustained winds of 115 mph (185 km/h). Idalia quickly weakened as it moved inland into southeast Georgia, and it was downgraded to a tropical storm at 18:00 UTC that same day. Strong southwesterly wind shear then pushed the storm's convection well north and east of its center as it moved off the northeastern South Carolina coast and emerged into the Atlantic early on August 31. Around 12:00 UTC, while about 60 mi (95 km) east of Cape Fear, North Carolina, Idalia transitioned into an extratropical cyclone. The storm then moved slowly eastward and impacted Bermuda with tropical-storm-force winds on September 2, as it passed just to the south. Idalia's remnant low then absorbed Tropical Storm Gert, turned northward, and lingered offshore Atlantic Canada for several days before dissipating on September 8.

During the storm's early stages, heavy rains fell along the Yucatán Peninsula and in western Cuba. Consequently, flooding occurred in some areas of the latter, especially in Artemisa and Pinar del Río provinces, forcing the evacuation of over 10,000 people. In Florida, high winds and storm surge reaching up to 8 to 12 ft (2.4 to 3.7 m) above the ground between Keaton Beach and Steinhatchee caused significant damage across the Big Bend region of Florida to agriculture, infrastructure, and buildings and residences, which were flooded up to several miles inland. Severe storm surge impacts extended southward to parts of the Tampa Bay area, with up to 5 ft (1.5 m) of water reported in approximately 2,000 homes in Pasco County. Roughly 150 people in the county required rescue during the storm. Tens of thousands of structures in Florida outside the Big Bend region sustained some degree of damage. Parts of Georgia and the Carolinas experienced rains, strong winds, storm surge, and tornadoes, but with lesser impacts than in Florida, while high tides were reported as far north as the Mid-Atlantic. Overall, Idalia caused approximately $3.6 billion in damage and twelve deaths in the United States – four in Florida, three each in North Carolina and New Jersey, and one each in Georgia and Delaware. The remnants of Idalia caused more than 6,000 power outages on Bermuda and the delay or cancellation of many flights to and from the L.F. Wade International Airport.

=== Tropical Storm Jose ===
- Tropical storm (SSHWS)
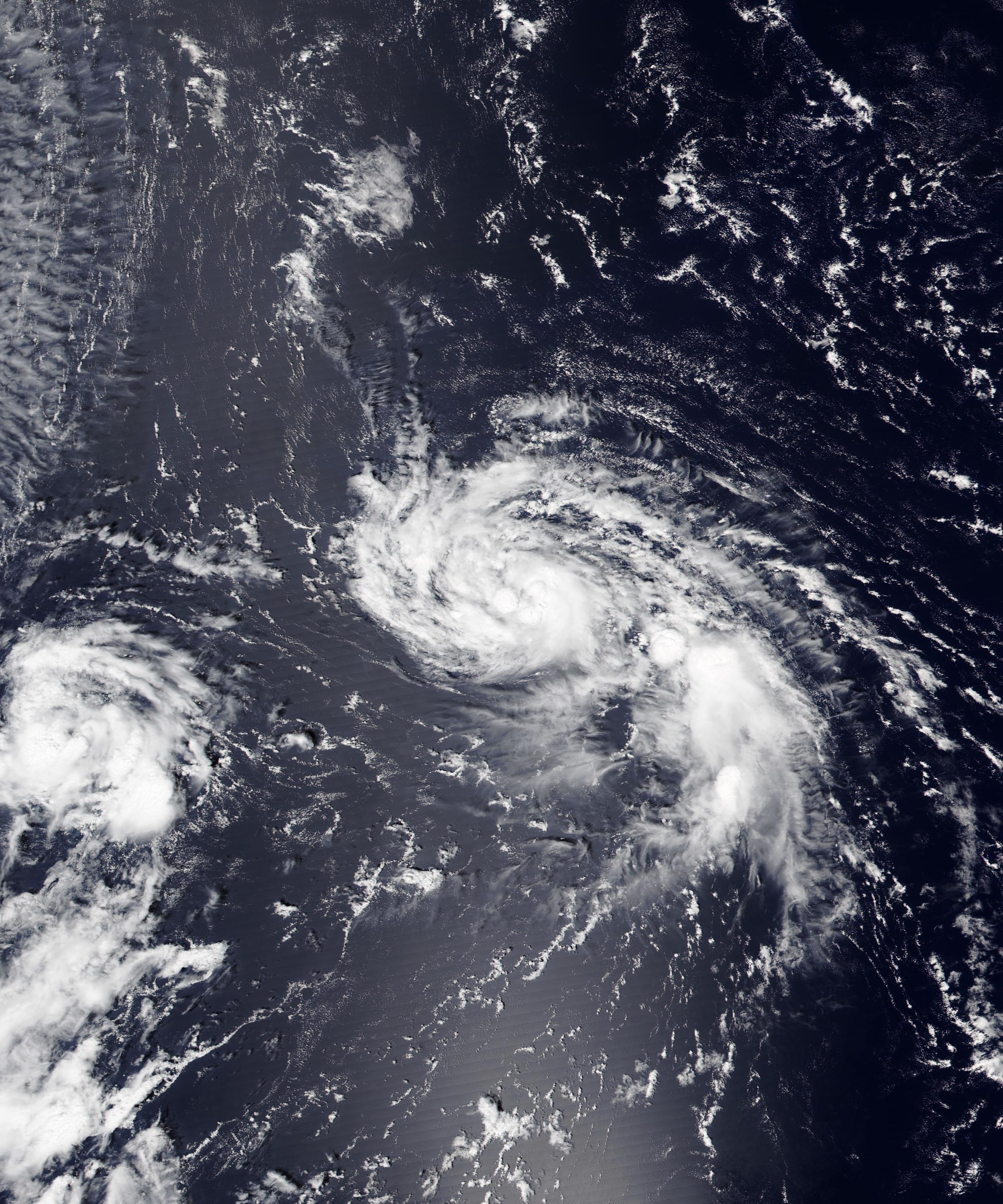
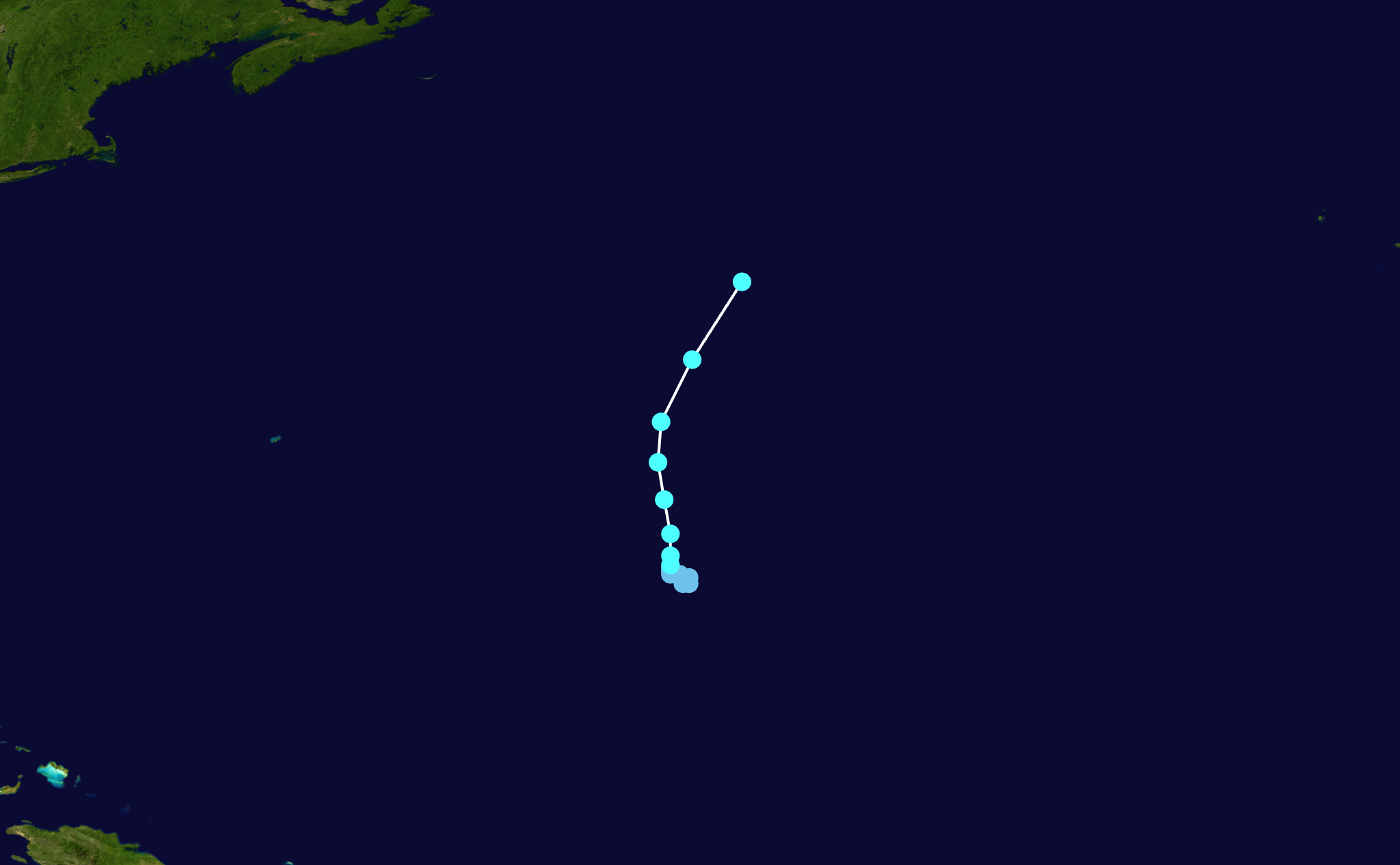
- Duration: August 29 – September 1
- Peak intensity: 65 mph (100 km/h) (1-min); 996 mbar (hPa)

On August 19, a vigorous tropical wave moved off the west coast of Africa. After traversing the Cabo Verde Islands, a low-pressure area developed on August 24. The disturbance struggled to organize until August 29, when persistent deep convection reignited over the eastern side of the circulation. Consequently, Tropical Depression Eleven formed about 850 mi (1,370 km) southeast of Bermuda. The depression meandered due weak steering currents over the next two days, and by August 30, had become less organized due to westerly shear. However, the shear briefly relaxed, and the storm's convective bursting pattern abruptly evolved into curved banding early on August 31, signifying that the depression had strengthened into Tropical Storm Jose. Further development occurred slowly as Jose's banding features remained limited, and the convection at its center was shallow. Even so, the storm's structure improved markedly early on September 1 as convection near the center deepened and a small mid-level eye feature appeared, causing Jose to peak with maximum sustained winds of 65 mph (100 km/h). This intensification was short lived however, and the storm soon began to weaken due to northerly shear from Hurricane Franklin's outflow. Jose then accelerated northward, pulled by the larger and stronger Franklin, and was absorbed into the latter late that day about 900 mi (1,450 km) northeast of Bermuda.

=== Tropical Storm Katia ===
- Tropical storm (SSHWS)
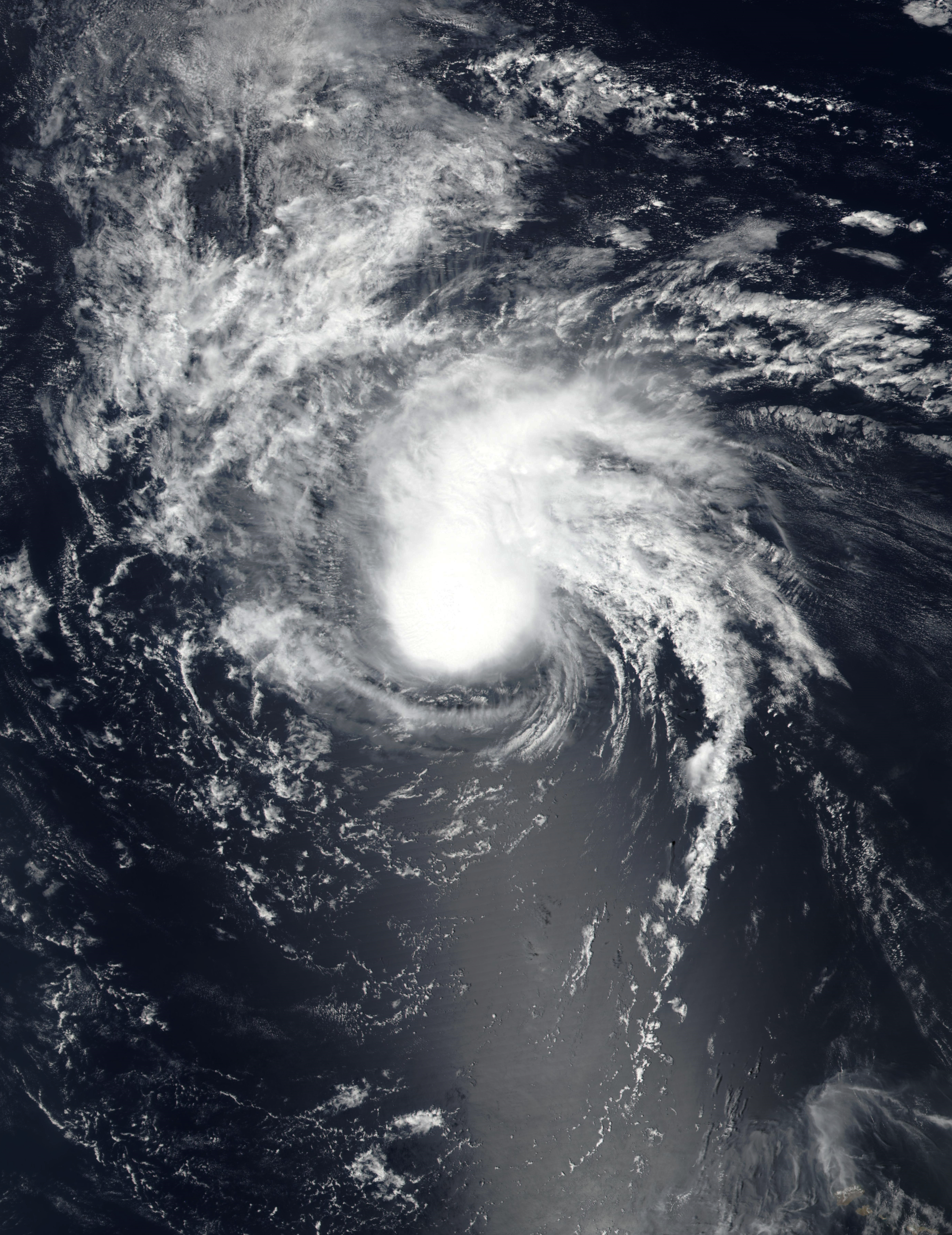
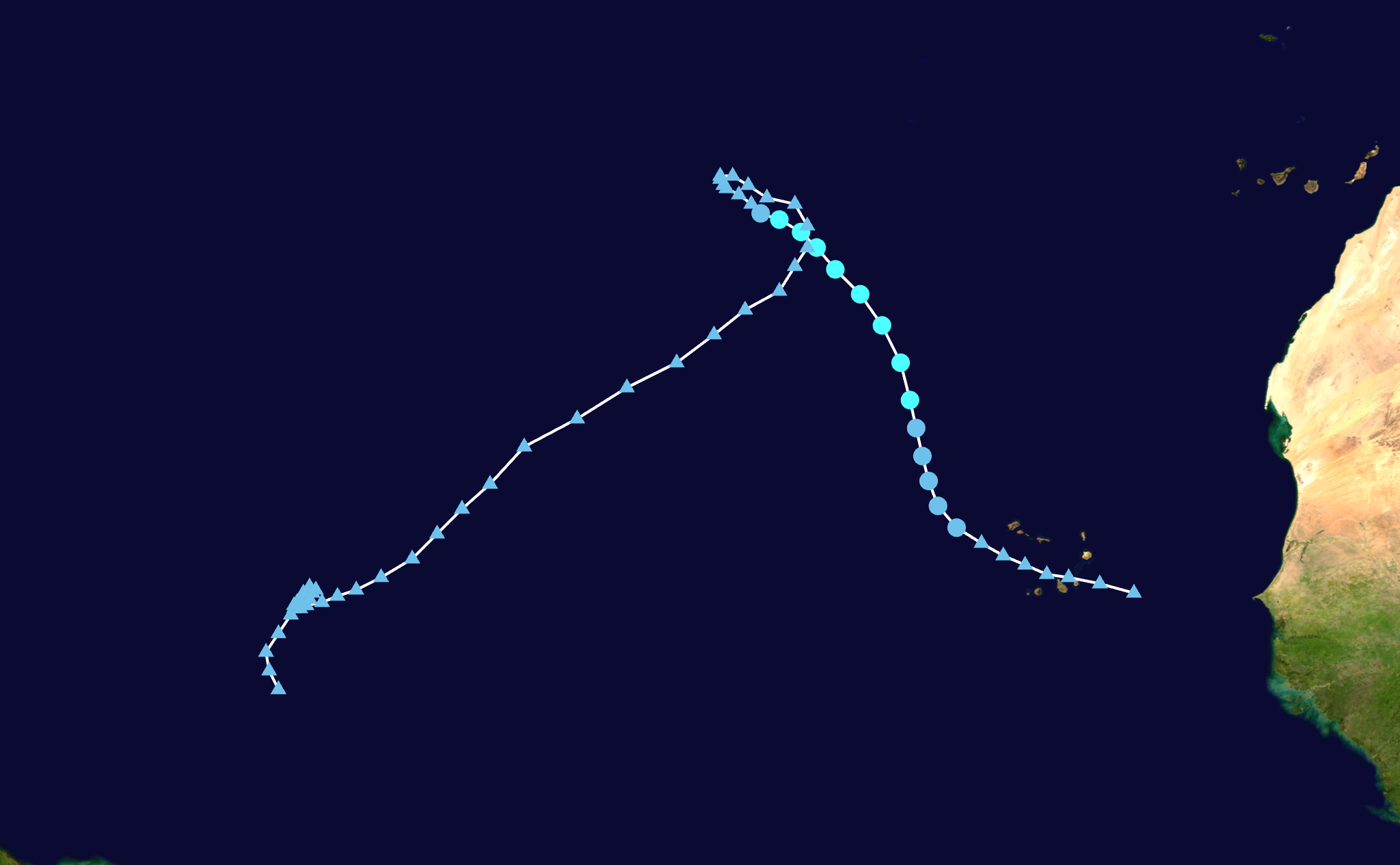
- Duration: August 31 – September 4
- Peak intensity: 60 mph (95 km/h) (1-min); 998 mbar (hPa)

On August 29, a tropical wave moved off the west coast of Africa. Although a well-defined circulation developed by the following day as the wave crossed the Cabo Verde Islands, convective disorganization did not allow the system to be classified as a tropical depression until late on August 31. Developing about 110 mi (175 km) west of Santo Antão, the depression moved north-northwestward and intensified into Tropical Storm Katia early on September 2. The storm continued to become better organized throughout the day, peaking with winds of 60 mph (95 km/h) around 18:00 UTC. Shortly thereafter, however, increasing wind shear caused Katia to weaken as its surface center became displaced far to the south of a remnant area of convection. By 00:00 UTC on September 4, far northwest of the Cabo Verde Islands, the storm had weakened to a tropical depression, six hours before degenerating into a remnant low. The low made an elongated loop and then began moving quickly southwestward. Several days later, the low made another loop over the Central Atlantic and turned southeastward before dissipating on September 15.

=== Hurricane Lee ===
- Category 5 hurricane (SSHWS)
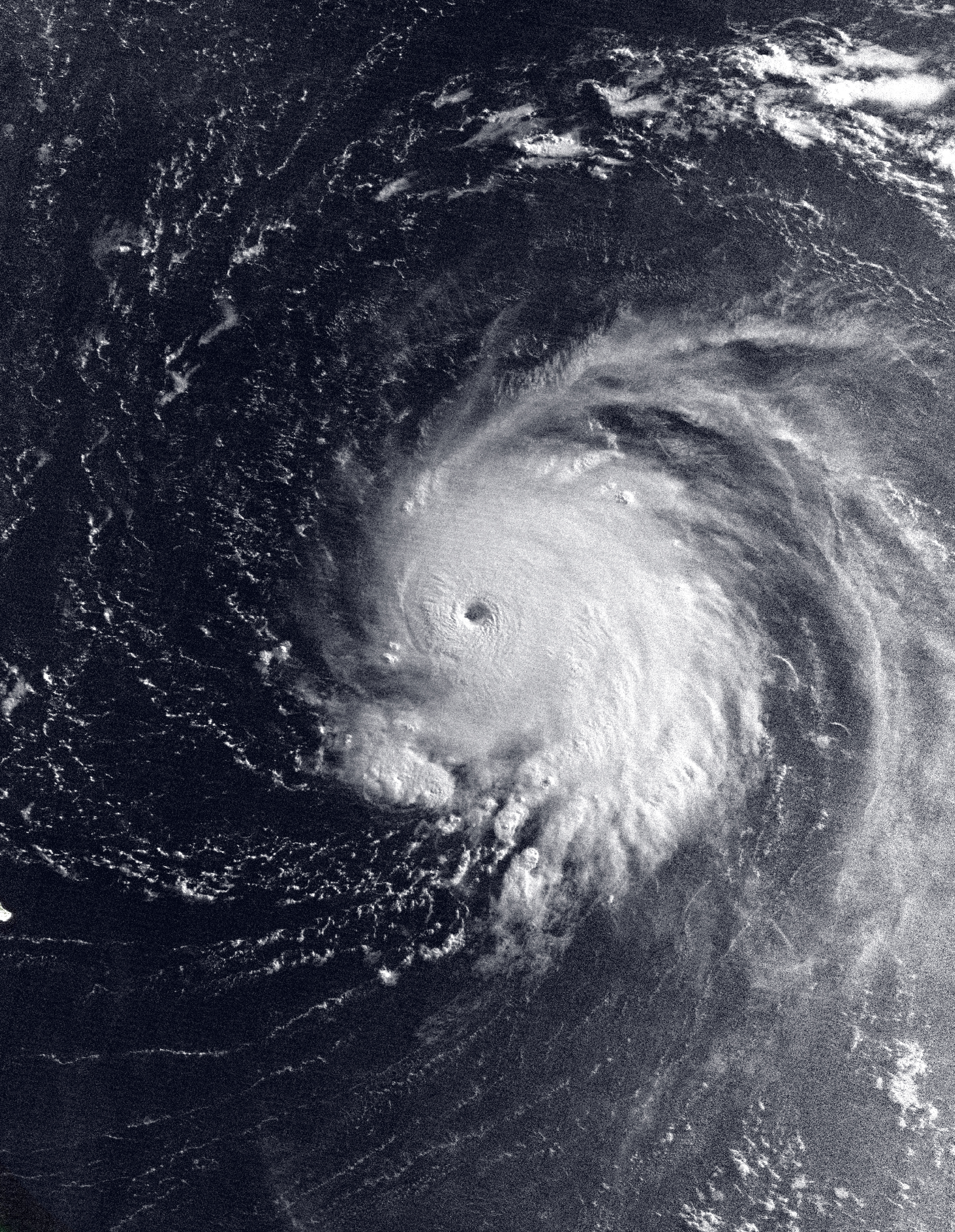
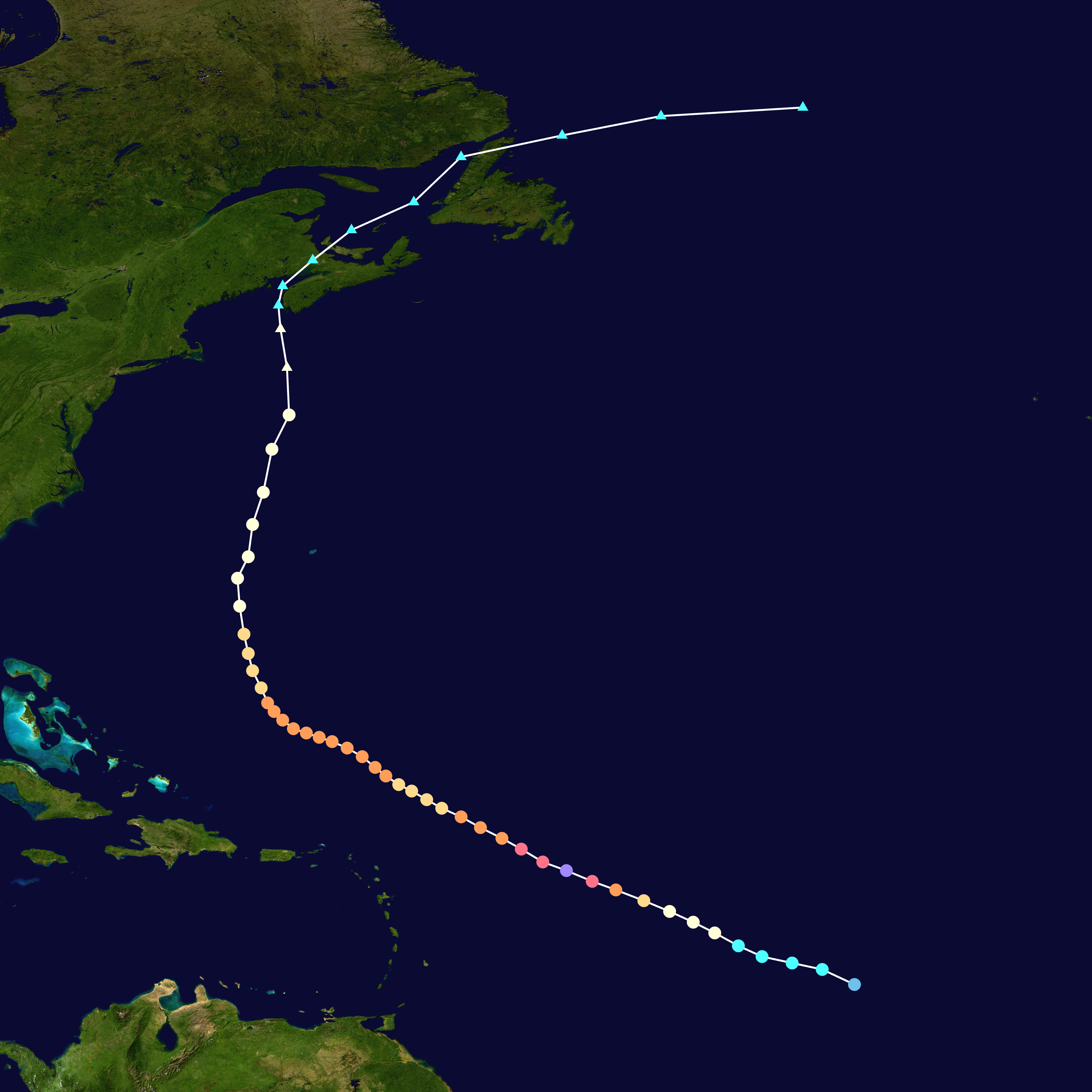
- Duration: September 5 – September 16
- Peak intensity: 165 mph (270 km/h) (1-min); 926 mbar (hPa)

On September 1, a tropical wave emerged into the tropical Atlantic from the west coast of Africa. A broad surface low formed by September 4, which acquired multiple low-level bands developing and a well-defined center on the next day. Consequently, Tropical Depression Thirteen developed at 12:00 UTC that day about halfway between the west coast of Africa and the Lesser Antilles. Amid favorable conditions for intensification, the depression quickly strengthened into Tropical Storm Lee six hours later and a then a hurricane by late on September 6. Then, during the 24‑hour period ending at 06:00 UTC on September 8, Lee experienced explosive intensification, and reached Category 5 strength, with its winds increasing by 80 mph (130 km/h) to 165 mph (270 km/h). However, increasing southwesterly wind shear quickly caused Lee's eye to become cloud filled and the storm became more asymmetric, weakening it back to a high-end Category 4 hurricane. The pace of weakening quickened as the day progressed, and Lee fell below major hurricane status by late on September 9, according to data from an evening hurricane hunters mission revealing that the storm was undergoing an eyewall replacement cycle and still being adversely affected by wind shear.

By September 10, wind shear abated, permitting the new, larger-diameter eye to contract and to grow more symmetric. As a result, Lee intensified to Category 3 strength once again that same day. Another series of eyewall replacement cycles led to fluctuations in its size and intensity, but Lee remained a major hurricane throughout. After tracking west-northwestward to northwestward for much of its trans‑Atlantic journey, Lee turned northward on September 13, moving around the western side of the steering subtropical ridge. That same day, it also weakened to Category 2 strength. Then, on the morning of September 14, Lee became a Category 1 hurricane while approaching Bermuda, which it passed to the west by 185 mi (300 km) later in the day. As the hurricane pushed northward, continued drier air entrainment and increasingly strong southerly wind shear displaced Lee's convection to the northern side of the system, weakening it further. These factors caused the hurricane to commence its extratropical transition, which was completed by 06:00 UTC on September 16. Later that day and throughout the next two days, the extratropical cyclone made several landfalls in Atlantic Canada before moving into the northern Atlantic and merging with another extratropical low late on September 18.

Rip currents caused one fatality in Puerto Rico when a 66-year-old man drowned at Poza del Obispo. Additionally, Lee generated dangerous surf and rip currents along the entire Atlantic coast of the United States. Lee produced hurricane-force winds gusts, along with flooding rains, mostly in Maine and Atlantic Canada. Consequently, approximately 200,000 power outages occurred in the United States, mostly in Maine, and a similar number in the Canadian provinces of New Brunswick and Nova Scotia. Maine and Atlantic Canada also reported many downed trees and power lines, as well as flash flooding, leading to road closures. Additionally, abnormally high tides and storm surge destroyed some roadways and a boardwalk in the Halifax area of Nova Scotia. Three storm-related fatalities occurred in the mainland of the United States: a 15-year-old boy drowned in Fernandina Beach, Florida; a 50-year-old man died in Searsport, Maine, when a tree fell onto the car he was in; and a 21-year-old man who was killed in Manasquan Inlet, New Jersey when the boat he was in capsized and sunk due to a tall wave. Total damage from the storm is estimated at $80 million, with $50 million in the United States and $30 million in Bermuda and Canada.

=== Hurricane Margot ===
- Category 1 hurricane (SSHWS)
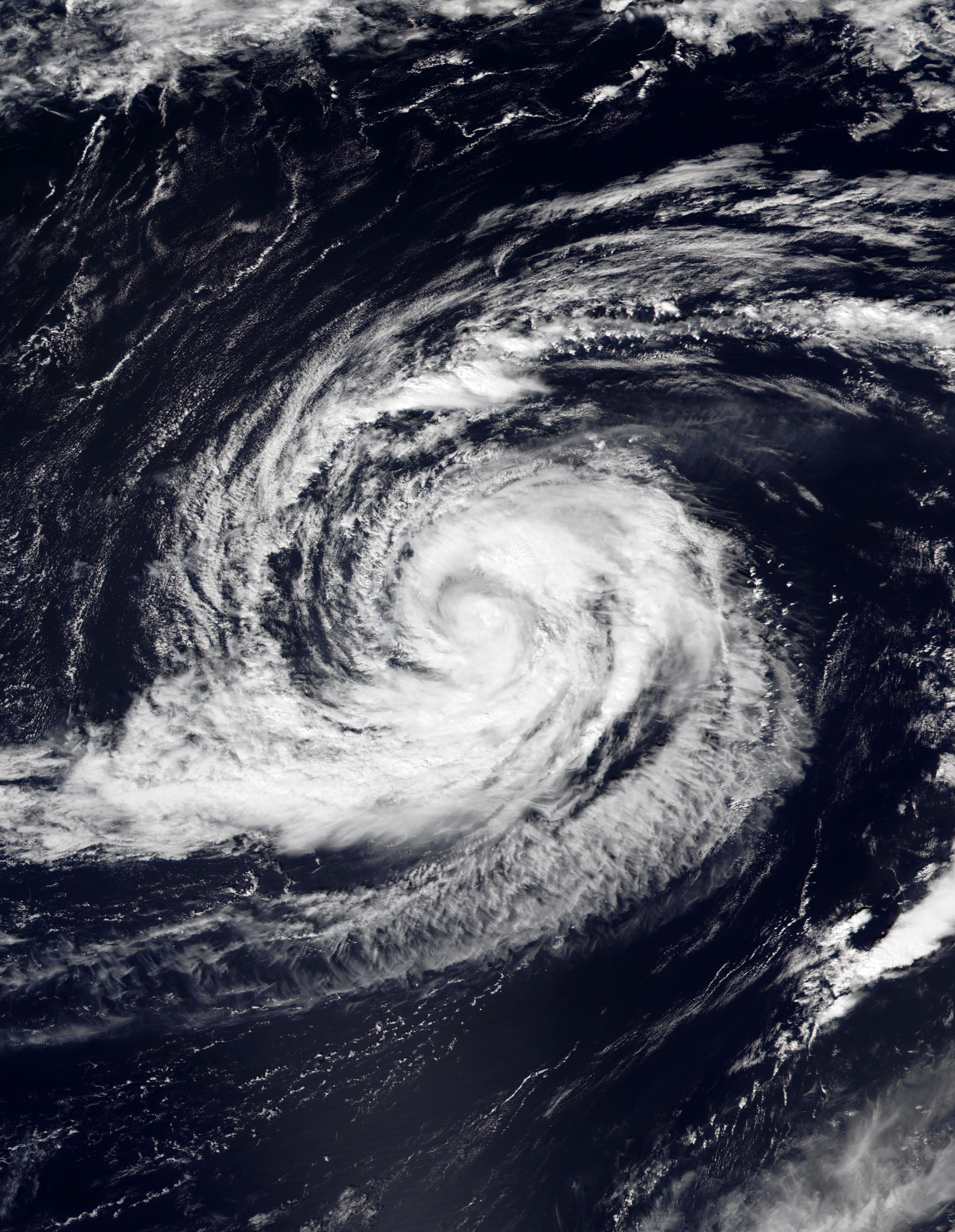
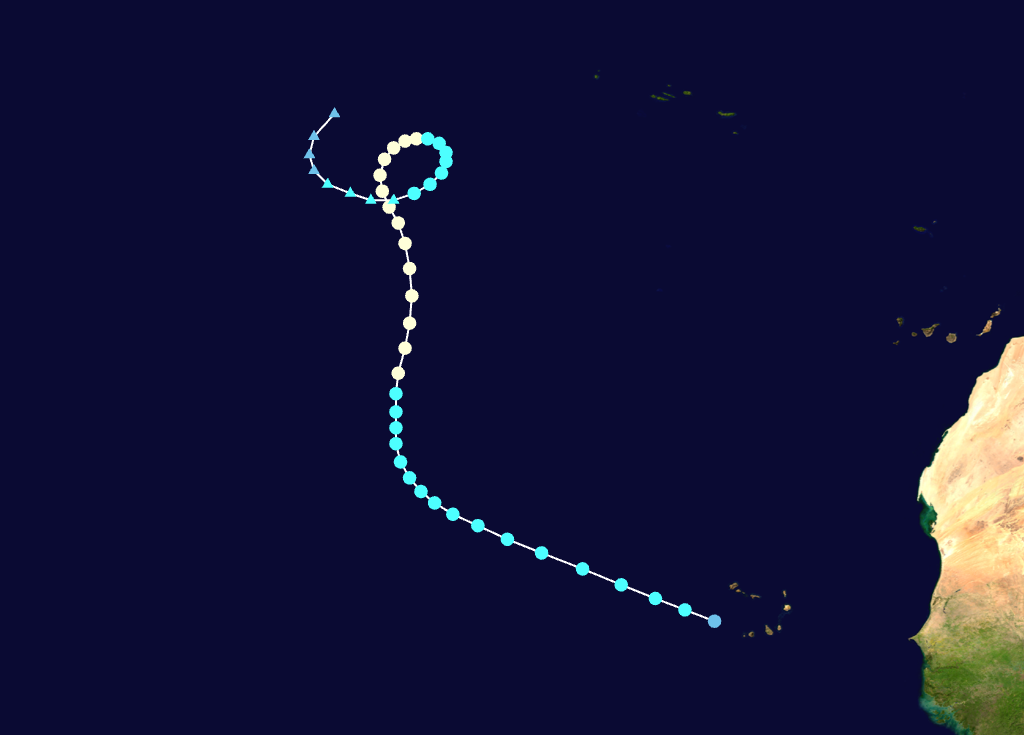
- Duration: September 7 – September 16
- Peak intensity: 90 mph (150 km/h) (1-min); 969 mbar (hPa)

A tropical wave moved off the west coast of Africa into the eastern tropical Atlantic on September 5. A broad area of low-pressure with a large area of disorganized showers and thunderstorms quickly formed within it shortly afterwards. By 12:00 UTC on September 7, the system organized into Tropical Depression Fourteen about 95 mi (155 km) northwest of Brava in the Cabo Verde Islands. Six hours later, the depression intensified into Tropical Storm Margot. Initially, northerly shear and dry mid-level air intrusion slowed organizational improvements, though bursts of deep convection and a diffluent outflow pattern beginning on September 9 allowed for some intensification to occur. Margot reached hurricane status by September 11, based on an eye that was becoming more defined and improvements to the storm's overall structure. It continued along a north to north-northwest track for a few days, exhibiting a double eyewall with a well-defined inner core and reaching winds of 90 mph (150 km/h) on September 13. Caught in weak steering currents by a building mid-level ridge to its north, Margot drifted east-southeastward as it began to make a clockwise loop. Upwelled cooler waters due to Margot's slow motion and large amounts of dry air caused it to weaken to a tropical storm on September 15. After convection became increasingly farther from the center, Margot degenerated into a remnant low about 715 mi (1,150 km) southwest of the Azores late on September 16. The remnant low completed the loop before dissipating two days later.

=== Hurricane Nigel ===
- Category 2 hurricane (SSHWS)
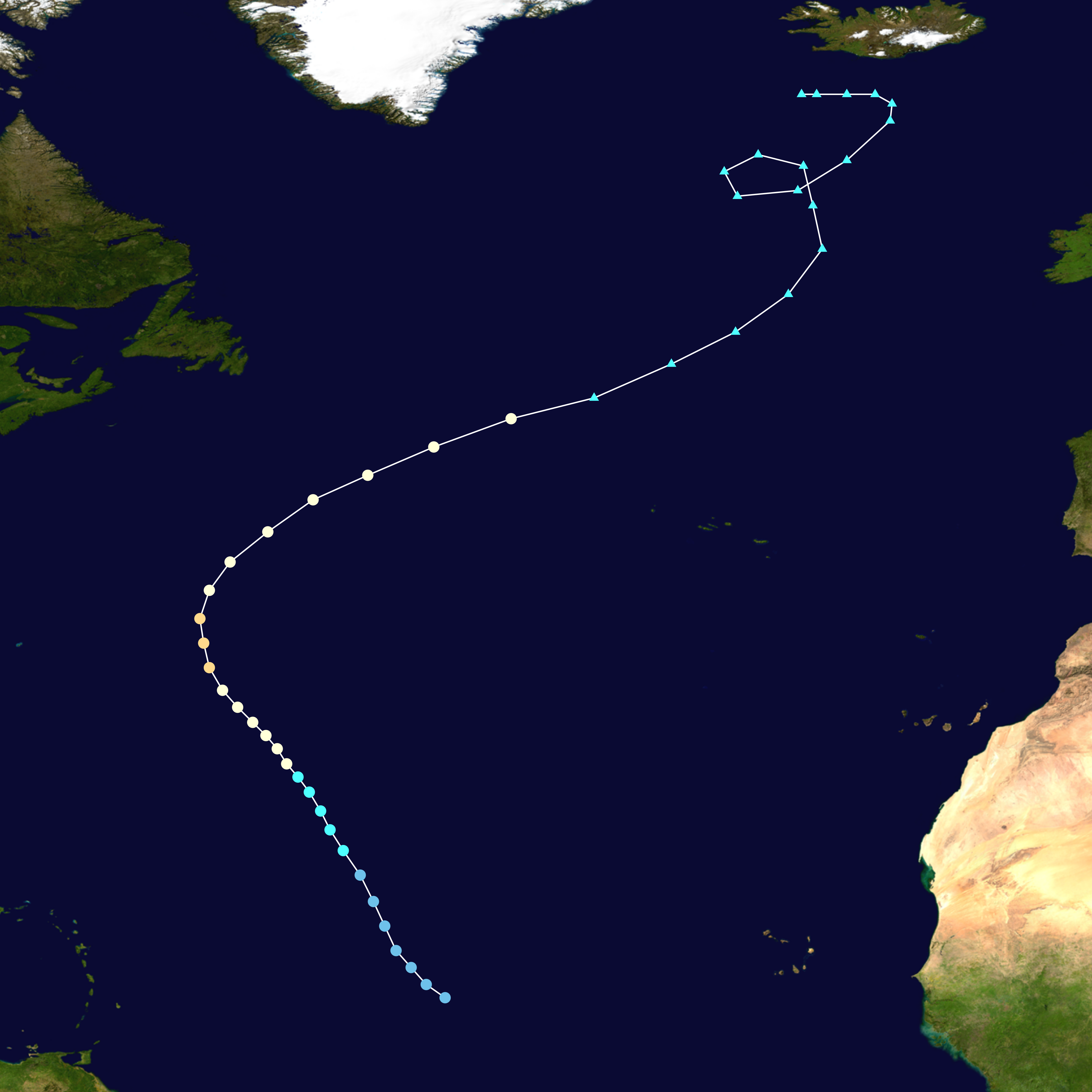
- Duration: September 15 – September 22
- Peak intensity: 100 mph (155 km/h) (1-min); 971 mbar (hPa)

On September 8, a tropical wave emerged into the Atlantic from the west coast of Africa. After merging with a nearby low-pressure area on September 12, the system gradually organized into Tropical Depression Fifteen by early on September 15 about 1,160 mi (1,865 km) east of Barbados. Initially fluctuating in intensity and organization, the depression developed convective banding in its northern semicircle late on September 16. Around 00:00 UTC the next day, the depression strengthened into Tropical Storm Nigel and then to a Category 1 hurricane early on September 18, as an eyewall began to develop. Although Nigel's eye became better defined and warmer on September 19, intruding dry air disrupted convection on the storm's north side. Nigel turned northward along the western edge of a mid-level ridge over the central subtropical Atlantic.

The system's large eye became fully surrounded by a solid band of deep convection, enabling Nigel to become a Category 2 hurricane later on September 19, displaying characteristics typical of an annular tropical cyclone. Early on September 20, Nigel peaked with winds of 100 mph (155 km/h). However, deep convection soon became limited to the southern portion of the band due to a break in the eyewall, causing the storm to weaken to Category 1 strength on September 20. The hurricane curved north-northeastward and then northeastward on September 21, and accelerated, within the flow on the southeastern side of a strong mid-latitude trough. At the same time, increasing southwesterly wind shear began causing an elongation of Nigel's cloud pattern, resulting in further weakening. Nigel also encountered sea surface temperatures falling below 68 °F (20 °C), leading to an extratropical transition northwest of the Azores early on September 22.

=== Tropical Storm Ophelia ===
- Tropical storm (SSHWS)
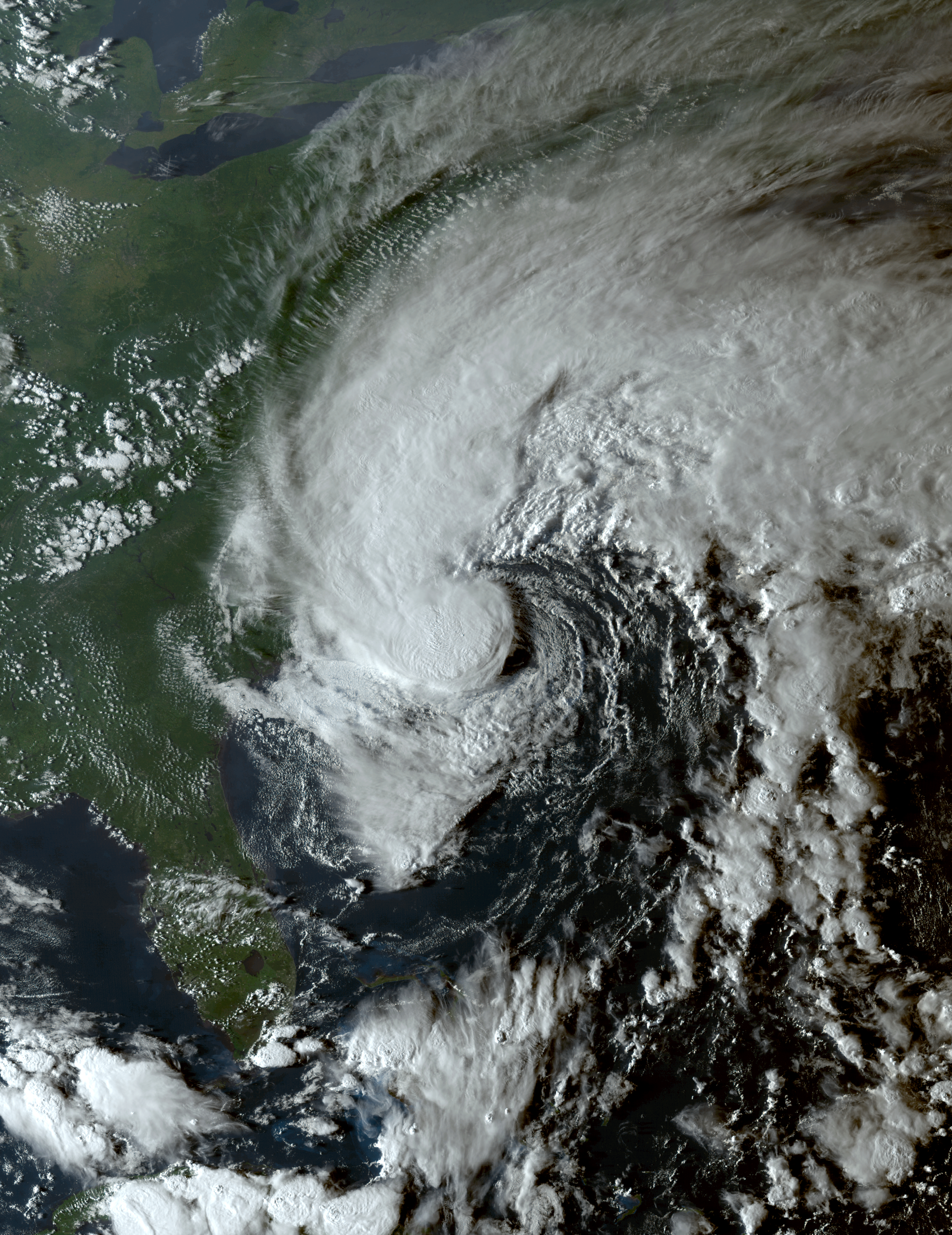
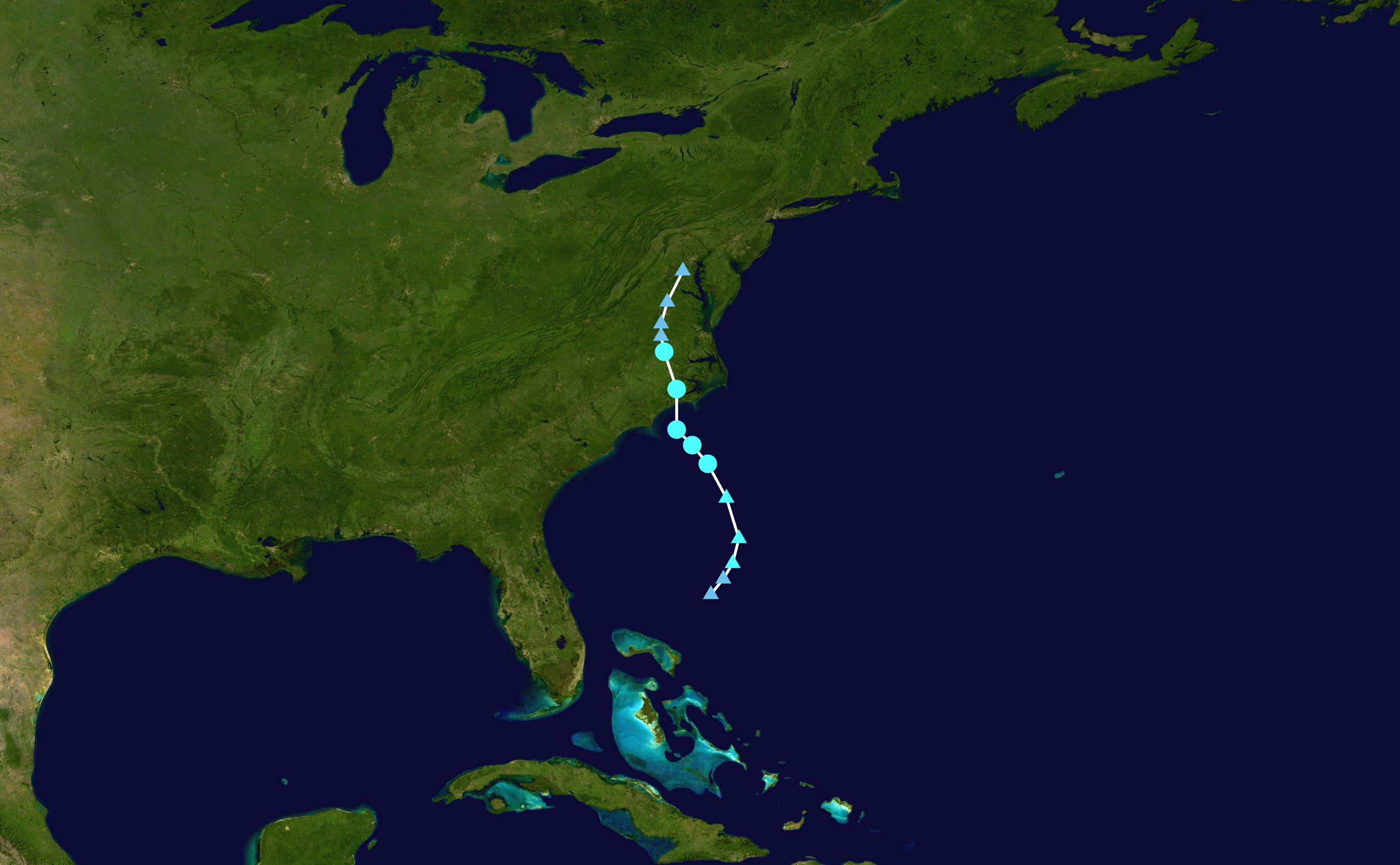
- Duration: September 22 – September 23
- Peak intensity: 70 mph (110 km/h) (1-min); 981 mbar (hPa)

On September 17, the NHC first noted the potential for tropical cyclone development near the southeast coast of the United States in its seven-day outlook. A broad non-tropical low formed on September 21, aided by the presence of a mid- to upper-level trough moving off the Southeastern United States. By late the following, the low shed its frontal characteristics and acquired more deep convection and tropical storm-force winds, leading to the development of Tropical Storm Ophelia. Early on September 23, the cyclone peaked with winds of 70 mph (110 km/h) and a minimum pressure of 981 mbar (29.0 inHg). Ophelia then made landfall around 10:15 UTC near Emerald Isle, North Carolina, about 25 mi (40 km) west-northwest of Cape Lookout. Inland, Ophelia quickly weakened and lost tropical characteristics, transitioning into an extratropical cyclone late on September 23 over southern Virginia. The low associated with Ophelia dissipated over Maryland on September 24, while the remnants meandered offshore the Mid-Atlantic for a few more days, until being absorbed by another nearby low.

States of emergency were declared in Virginia, North Carolina, and Maryland ahead of the storm. Five people aboard an anchored catamaran near Cape Lookout, North Carolina, had to be rescued by the U.S. Coast Guard due to deteriorating conditions as the storm approached. Floodwaters inundated communities and roadways along the Atlantic seaboard from North Carolina to New Jersey. The highest storm surge was 3.67 ft (1.12 m) above mean sea level at Sewell's Point, Virginia. Tropical storm‑force winds, as well as wind gusts up to 75 mph (121 km/h) at Southport, North Carolina, downed trees and power lines and caused sporadic property damage along its path, while also leaving about 70,000 homes without electricity in eastern North Carolina and Virginia combined. Heavy rain also fell along the East Coast of the United States, with up to 9.51 in (242 mm) of precipitation near Greenville, North Carolina. Ophelia and its remnants caused about $450 million in damage. On September 28–29, the low which had absorbed Ophelia's remnants stalled offshore, causing heavy flash flooding in the New York metropolitan area.

=== Tropical Storm Philippe ===
- Tropical storm (SSHWS)
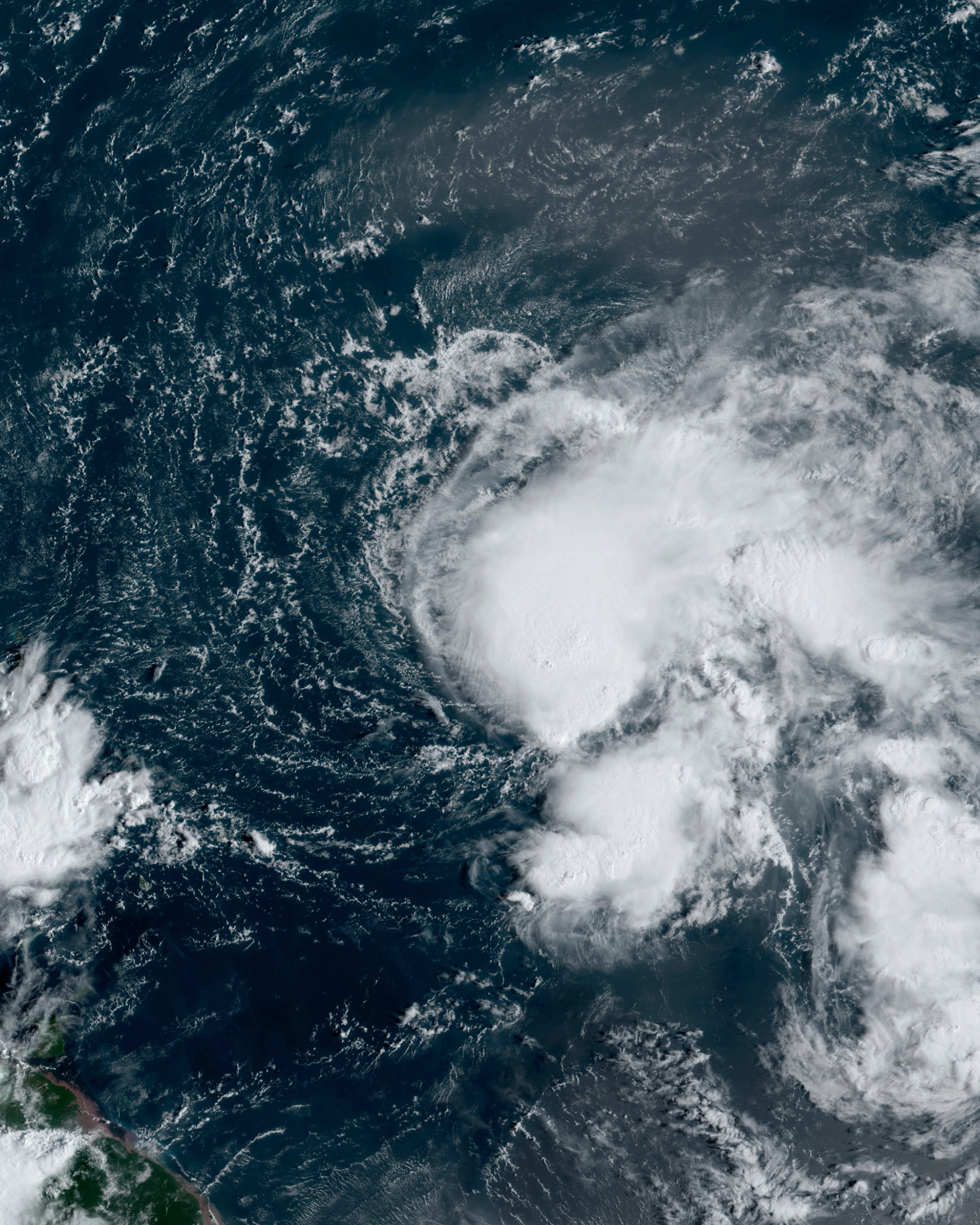
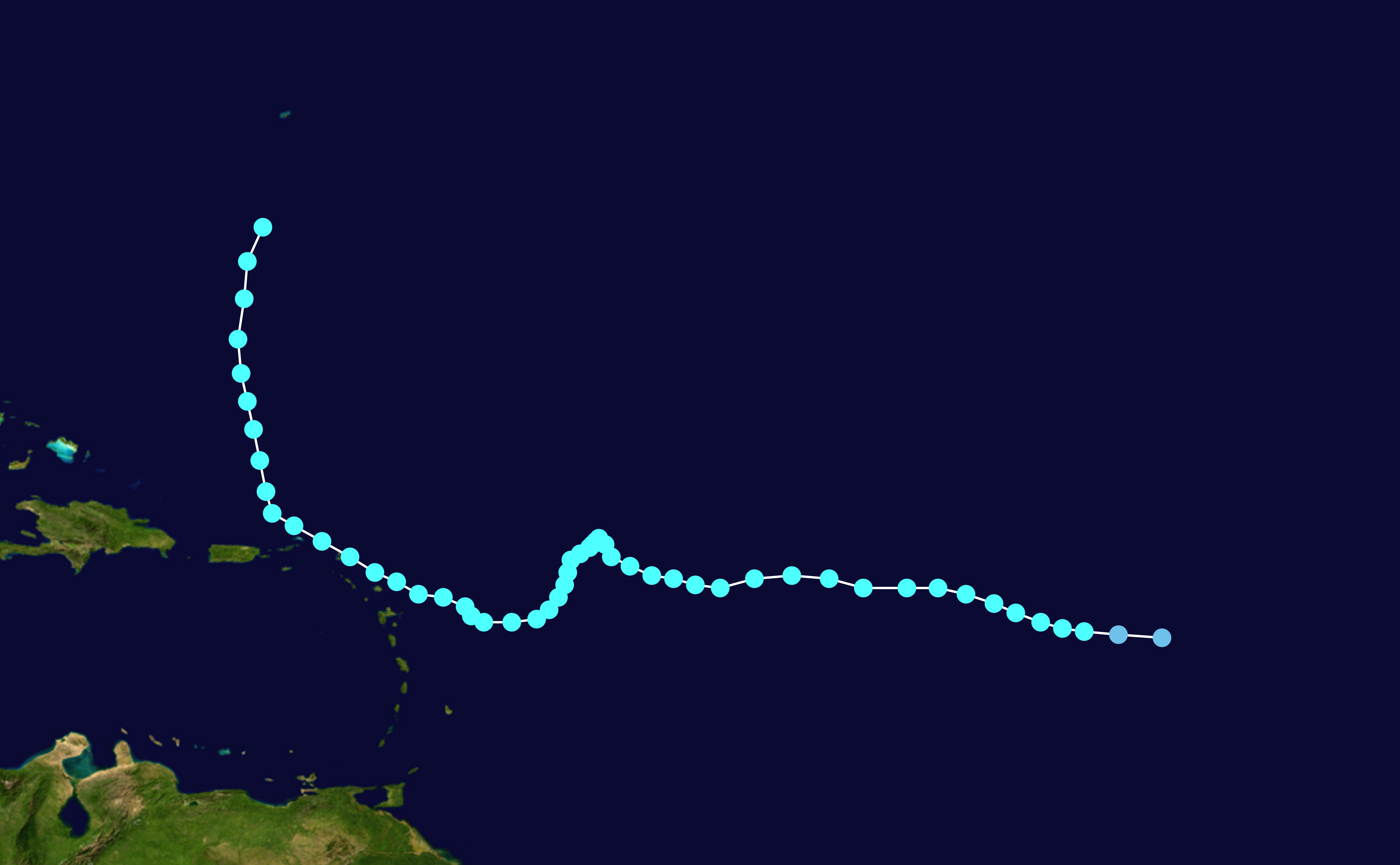
- Duration: September 23 – October 6
- Peak intensity: 60 mph (95 km/h) (1-min); 998 mbar (hPa)

On September 20, a tropical wave moved offshore West Africa and into the Atlantic. The wave developed into a low-pressure area by the next day, which organized into Tropical Depression Seventeen roughly 1,550 mi (2,495 km) east of Barbados on September 23. Later that day, the depression became Tropical Storm Philippe and continued to strengthen due to warm waters and light to moderate wind shear while moving westward along the southern side of a mid-level ridge. After reaching winds of 60 mph (95 km/h) early on September 25, Philippe encountered stronger wind shear, causing the center to become exposed. Between September 27 and September 28, the cyclone nearly stalled and moved north-northwestward before curving southwestward due to the aforementioned ridge being replaced by another one and the close proximity of Rina. Philippe's slowed motion allowed for some re-intensification, again reaching winds of 60 mph (95 km/h) late on September 30. However, wind shear soon stripped convection away from the center again by the next day. On October 2, the storm turned northwestward and struck Barbuda at 22:45 UTC with winds of 50 mph (85 km/h), before passing near the Virgin Islands the next day. Philippe turned northward on October 4, and weakened some due to wind shear. The storm briefly re-strengthened on October 5 due to interaction with a trough. However, the trough also generated a non-tropical low, which absorbed Philippe around 12:00 UTC on October 6 about 175 mi (280 km) south of Bermuda.

In Guadeloupe, some areas were left without running water, and 2,500 power outages occurred. The storm also washed out roads, caused mudslides, damaged multiple schools, and dropped up to 16.41 in (417 mm) of precipitation at Vieux-Fort. Floodwaters inundated several homes and vehicles in Antigua and Barbuda. In Antigua, a fire ignited due to a lightning strike produced by Philippe burned down several buildings at a yacht club. Philippe's strong winds helped spread the fire. Preliminary losses for the fire are in the millions of Eastern Caribbean Dollars (US$370,000). Off the United States Virgin Islands, 12 people were rescued after a ship started to submerge in rough seas. Authorities reported widespread damage to buildings, roads, and agriculture. Premier Natalio Wheatley issued a contingency warrant totaling $500,000 to support recovery efforts from the storm. Puerto Rico also felt impacts from Philippe's strong winds and rain. Damage totaled to $16,000. Bermuda experienced some strong winds and rain but reported only minor damage. A cold front and Philippe's remnants combined to bring up to 6 in (150 mm) to parts of Maine on October 7 and October 8. Gusts in the state were in the 50–60 mph (85–95 km/h) range, while many locations in Atlantic Canada reported gale-force winds.

=== Tropical Storm Rina ===
- Tropical storm (SSHWS)
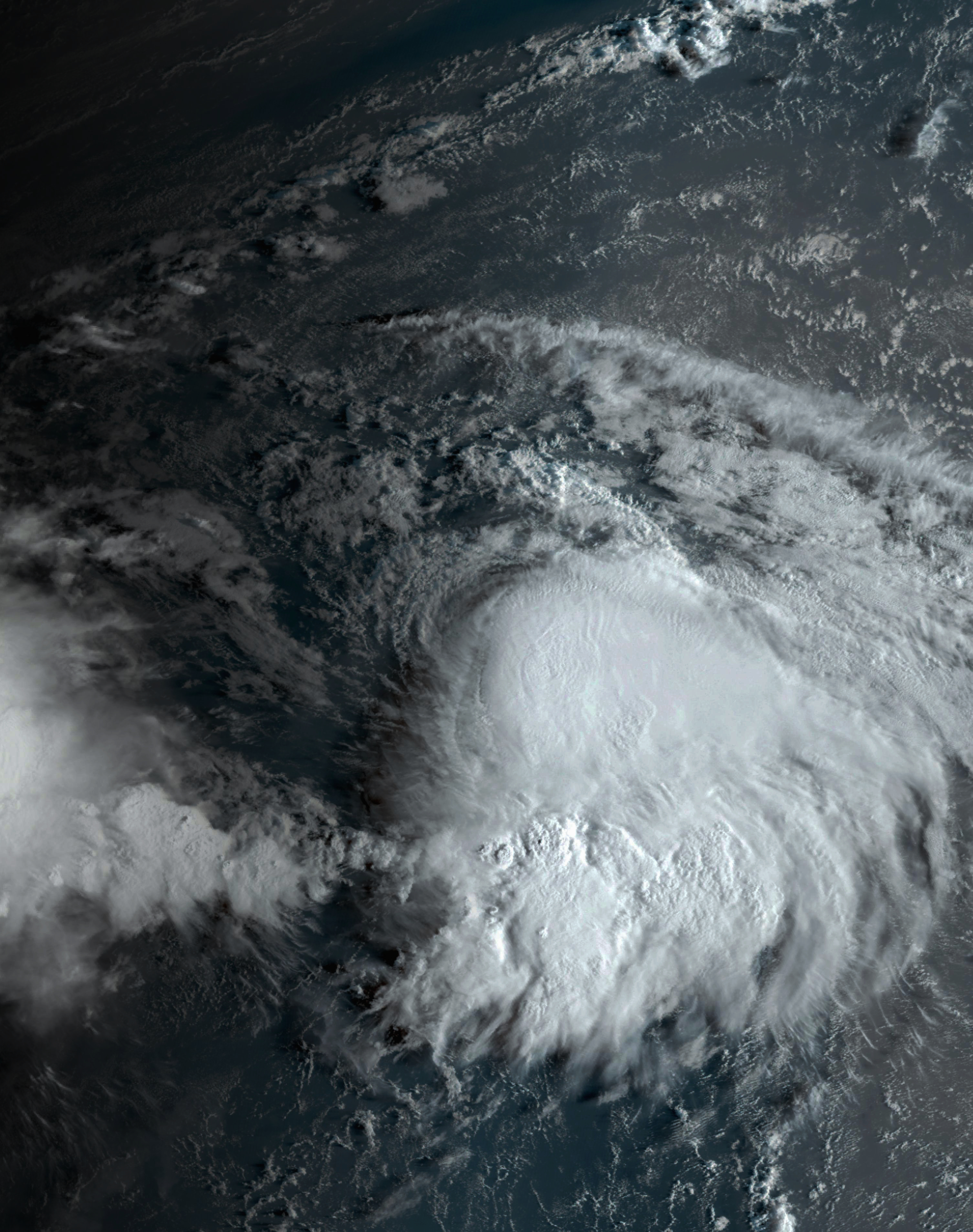
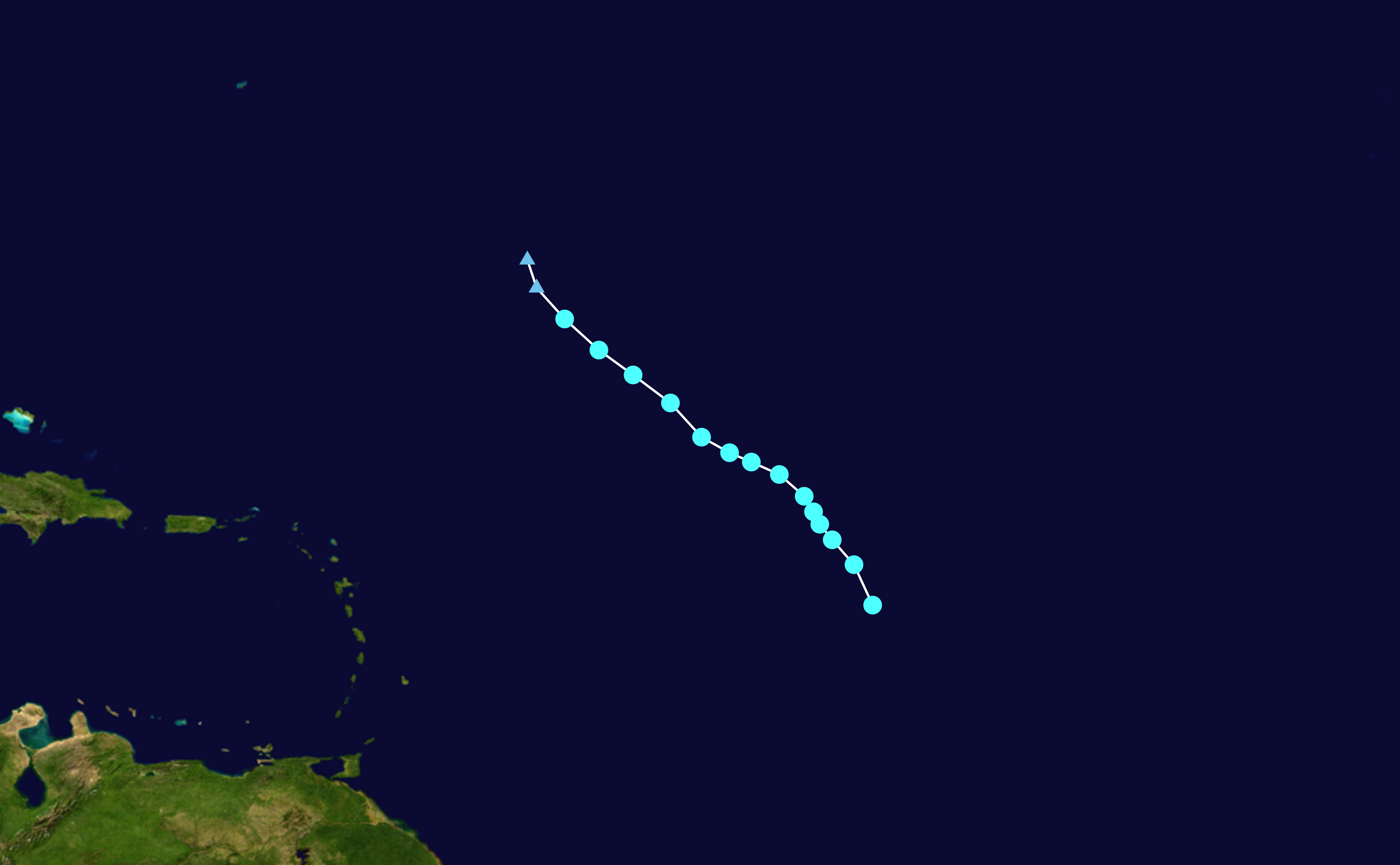
- Duration: September 28 – October 1
- Peak intensity: 50 mph (85 km/h) (1-min); 999 mbar (hPa)

Between September 22 and September 23, a tropical wave crossed the west coast of Africa and entered the Atlantic. A broad area of low pressure formed the next day, and the showers and thunderstorms within this disturbance began showing signs of organization a couple days later. Early on September 28, the system organized into Tropical Storm Rina about 1,000 mi (1,610 km) east-northeast of Barbados. The next day, Rina's wind field became slightly larger and stronger. But it only intensified for a brief time, peaking with winds of 50 mph (85 km/h) before weakening on account of strong northeasterly wind shear and dry mid-level air. Rina became devoid of organized deep convection early on October 1, and its surface circulation became increasingly ill-defined during the day. Consequently, the system degenerated into a remnant low around 18:00 UTC about 670 mi (1,080 km) southeast of Bermuda. The remnant low dissipated early on October 2.

=== Tropical Storm Sean ===
- Tropical storm (SSHWS)
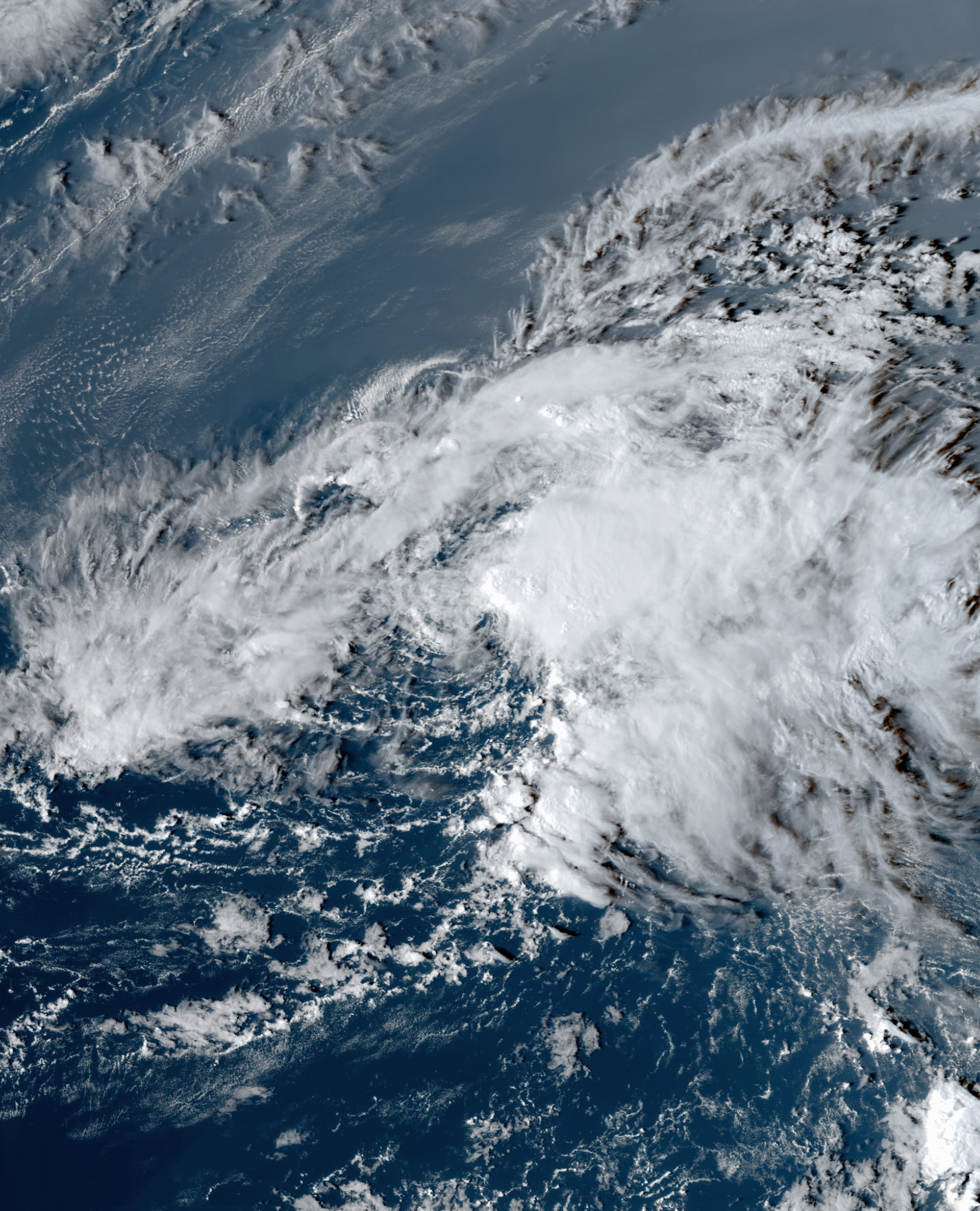
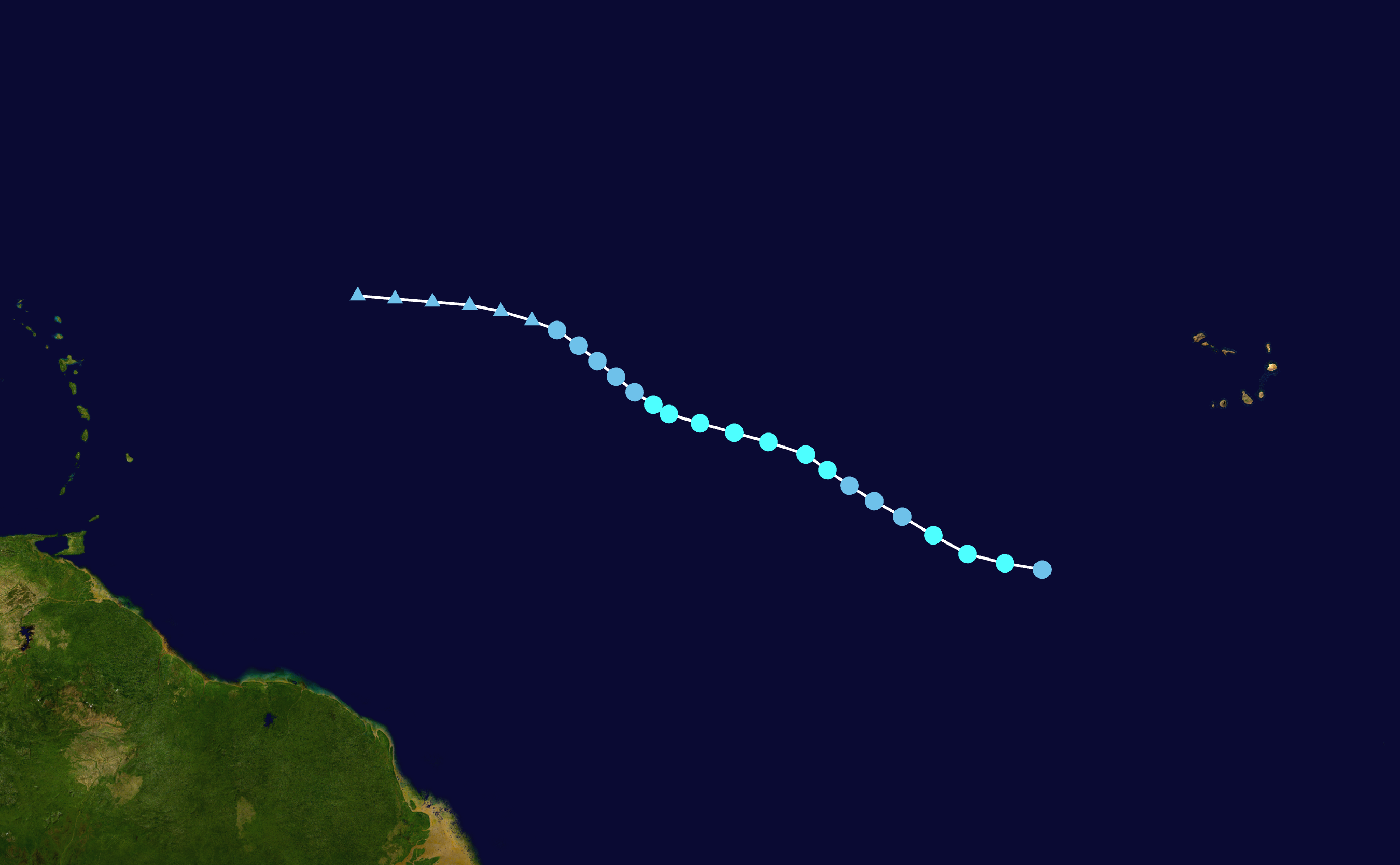
- Duration: October 10 – October 15
- Peak intensity: 45 mph (75 km/h) (1-min); 1005 mbar (hPa)

On October 5, a potent low-latitude tropical wave moved off the west coast of Africa. Dry air and vertical wind shear initially hindered tropical cyclogenesis. However, environmental conditions began improving on October 9, leading to the formation of a tropical depression about 525 mi (845 km) southwest of the southernmost Cabo Verde Islands late the next day. The depression quickly intensified into Tropical Storm Sean early on October 11. However, Sean remained a highly sheared storm and weakened back to a tropical depression several hours later. Around 12:00 UTC on October 12, Sean re-strengthened into a tropical storm, shortly before peaking with winds of 45 mph (75 km/h). Little additional organization occurred; by early on October 14, convective bursts became intermittent and fairly short-lived, and the storm weakened once more to a tropical depression. Thereafter, Sean degraded slowly, lingering for a day and a half before becoming a remnant low on October 15 about 970 mi (1,560 km) east of the Leeward Islands. The low continued slowly west-northwestward before dissipating late the next day.

=== Hurricane Tammy ===
- Category 2 hurricane (SSHWS)
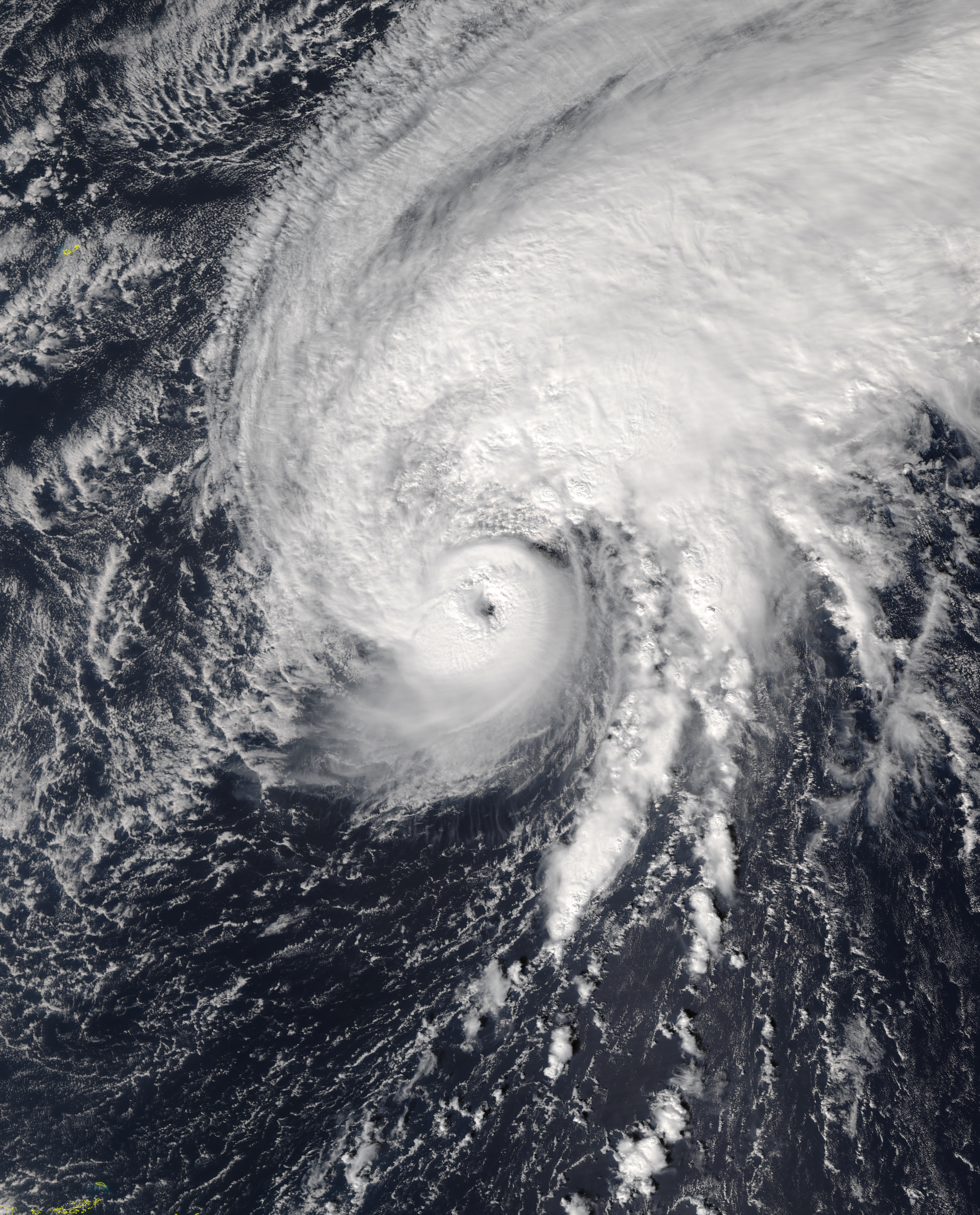
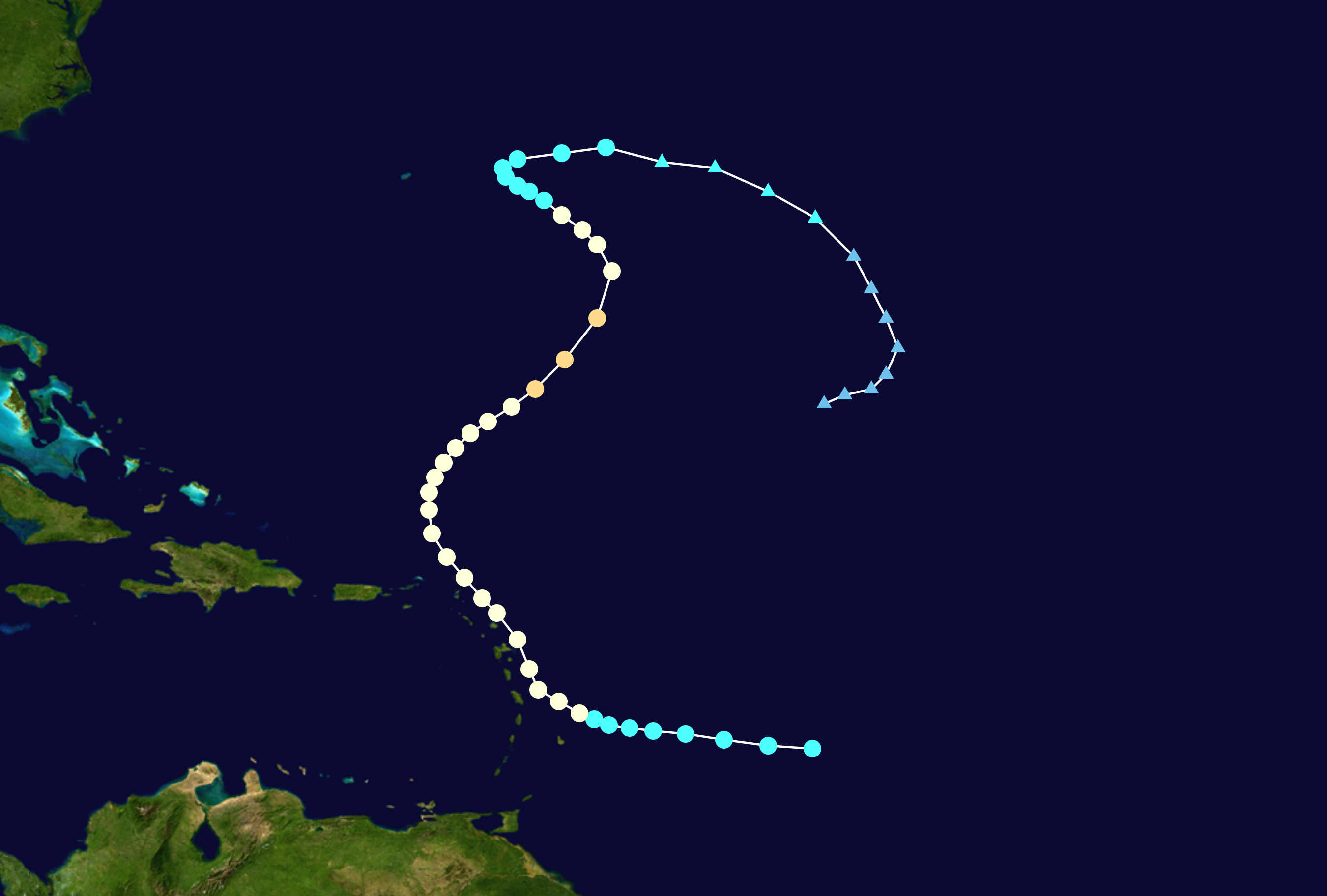
- Duration: October 18 – October 28
- Peak intensity: 110 mph (175 km/h) (1-min); 965 mbar (hPa)

A well-defined tropical wave entered the Atlantic from the west coast of Africa between October 9 and October 10. The wave developed a low by October 11 while passing through the Cabo Verde Islands, but dry air and strong wind shear caused it to struggle to organize further until October 17. By then, persistent convection formed, gradually leading disturbance to organize into Tropical Storm Tammy late on October 18 roughly 575 mi (925 km) east of the Lesser Antilles. The storm steadily strengthened while moving west-northwestward, becoming a hurricane late on October 20. Tammy then moved northwestward and north-northwestward for the next few days due to a steering ridge being forced eastward as a result of a trough exiting the East Coast of the United States. During this time, the hurricane remained very close to the Lesser Antilles and struck Barbuda with winds of 90 mph (150 km/h) at 01:15 UTC on October 22. After pulling away from the Leeward Islands that day, Tammy weakened to a minimal hurricane while struggling against wind shear.

By October 25, however, Tammy began to strengthen while interacting with an upper-level trough and later that day peaked as a Category 2 hurricane with maximum sustained winds of 110 mph (175 km/h). Shortly after Tammy reached peak intensity, a cold front to the north, a drier air mass, and an increase in wind shear diminished the cyclone's convection and caused it to weaken to a tropical storm early on October 27. Though the storm became significantly asymmetrical, it maintained a warm core. Tammy then turned eastward along the northern periphery of a subtropical ridge and briefly re-developed more convection, but degenerated into a remnant low late on October 28 about 470 mi (755 km) east-northeast of Bermuda. The remnant low opened into a trough over the central Atlantic late on October 31.

Barbuda and Antigua both received minimal damage, though blackouts occurred across both islands. At least two families on Barbuda had to be evacuated. Among the islands of Guadeloupe, only La Désirade experienced hurricane-force winds. There were no reports of serious storm damage. Rainfall amounts across the Leeward Islands were between 4 and 8 in (100 and 200 mm), and storm surge heights were between 1 and 3 ft (0.30 and 0.91 m). Puerto Rico was also affected by Tammy's strong winds and rain. Damage totaled to $13,000. Bermuda was impacted with wind gusts of 40 mph (65 km/h).

=== Tropical Depression Twenty-One ===
- Tropical depression (SSHWS)
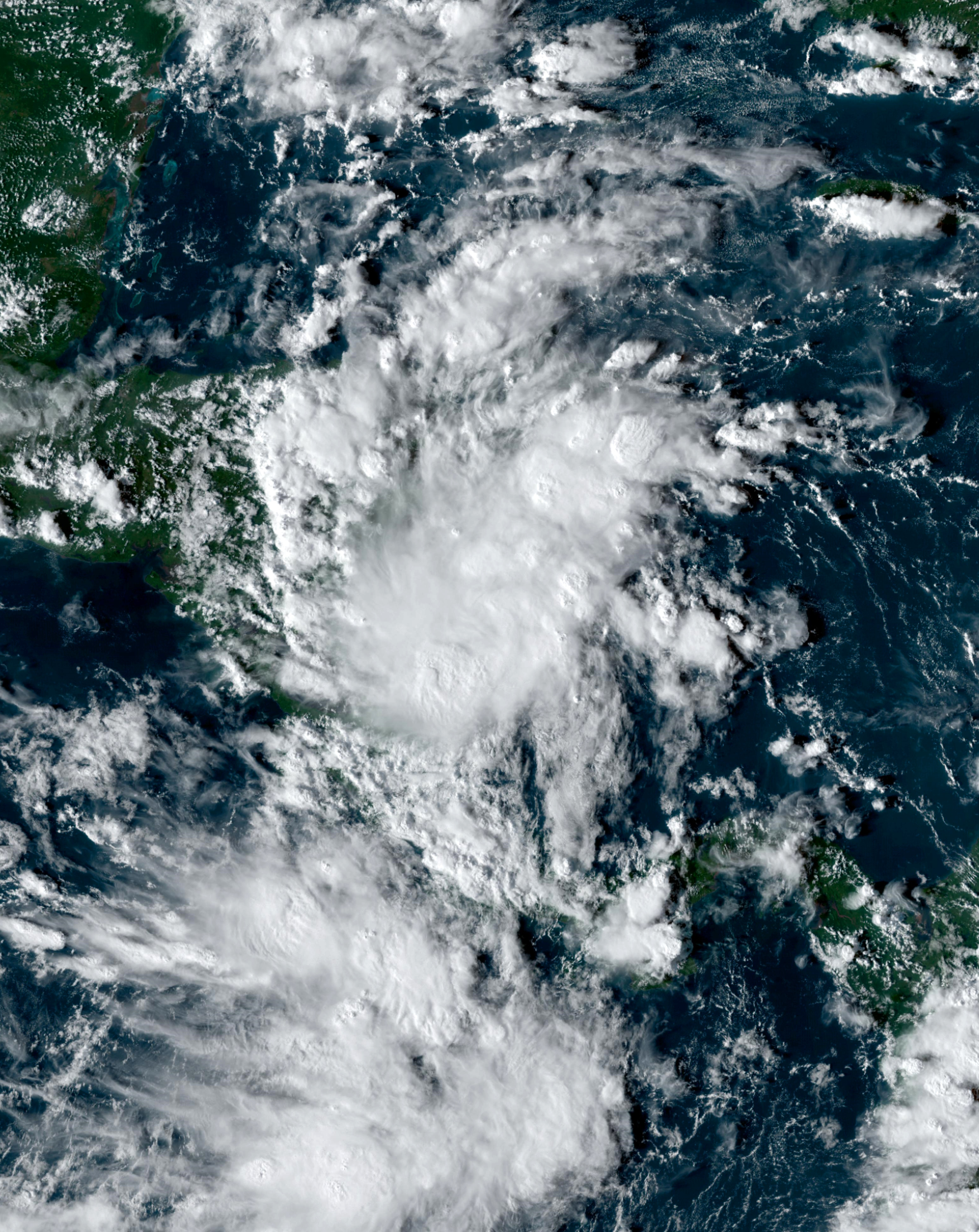
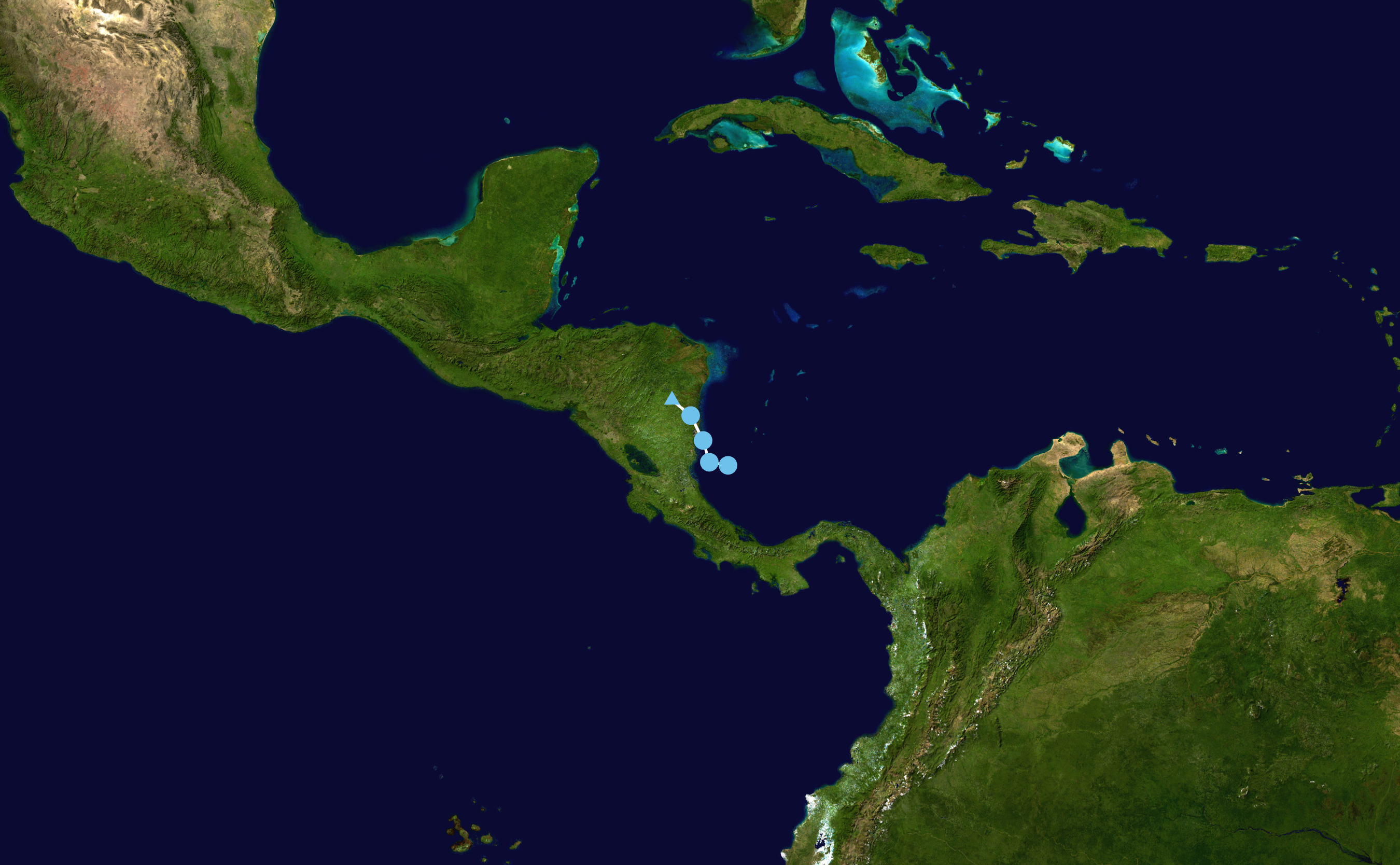
- Duration: October 23 – October 24
- Peak intensity: 30 mph (45 km/h) (1-min); 1007 mbar (hPa)

An area of disturbed weather within the eastern Pacific monsoon trough developed into a broad low-pressure area over the far southwestern Caribbean on October 22. The low quickly acquired more deep convection and a well-defined circulation, signaling the formation of a tropical depression at 12:00 UTC on the next day roughly 80 mi (130 km) east of southern Nicaragua. However, no intensification occurred prior to the depression making landfall in Nicaragua near Pearl Lagoon in the South Caribbean Coast Autonomous Region at 01:30 UTC on October 24 with winds of 30 mph (45 km/h). By 12:00 UTC, the depression degenerated into a remnant low, which dissipated shortly thereafter near Rosita. The remnants of the depression crossed over Central America and contributed to the formation of Tropical Storm Pilar in the Eastern Pacific.

The depression produced 3 to 5 in (76 to 127 mm) of rain over southeastern Nicaragua, with some locally higher totals, including 5.13 in (130 mm) of precipitation in Bluefields over a 48-hour period. Despite heavier rains, there were no visible reports of damages or casualties from the system.

=== Other system ===
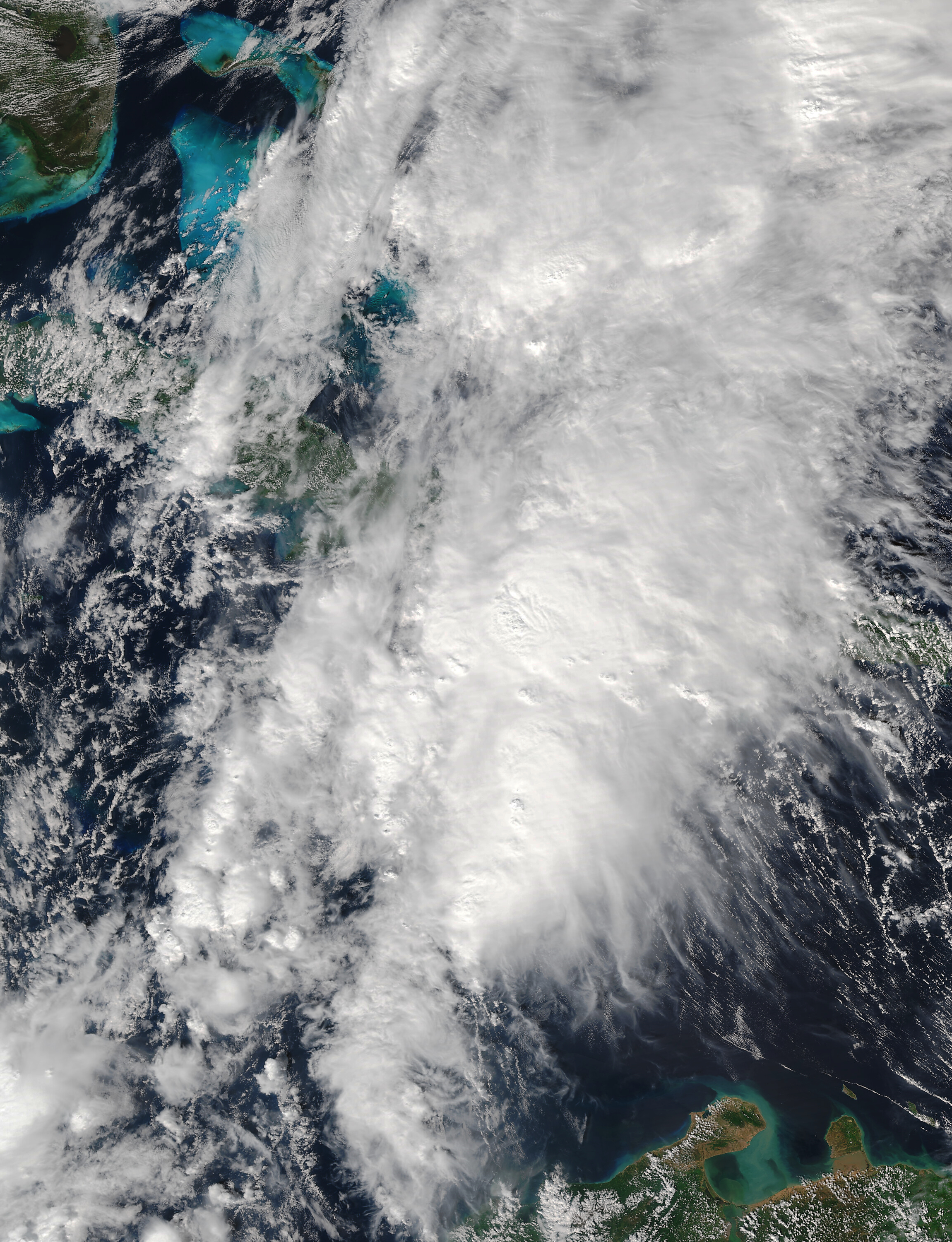
Potential Tropical Cyclone Twenty-Two over the Caribbean Sea on November 16.

A broad area of low pressure formed over the southwestern Caribbean Sea on November 14. The disturbance became more organized on November 16. Satellite images and data gathered during a U.S. Air Force Reserve hurricane hunter flight showed that the system had a closed yet elongated circulation, but there was not a well-defined low level center. At 21:00 UTC on November 16, the NHC designated the system Potential Tropical Cyclone Twenty-Two. The system was unable to organize further due to persistent high wind shear, and only produced near gale-force peak winds of 30–35 mph (45–55 km/h). At 03:00 UTC on November 18 the NHC issued their final advisory on the system, then located between Cuba and Jamaica, after it seemed likely that the disturbance would neither develop nor produce tropical storm-force winds.

Though tropical cyclogenesis was stifled, the disturbance generated intense thunderstorms spreading over southeastern Central America and across a wide swath of the Greater Antilles. The latter region recorded heavy rainfall, with up to 12.42 in (315 mm) of precipitation in Jamaica and 19 in (480 mm) in the Dominican Republic. In Jamaica, flooding forced the rescue of 24 people, while about 24,000 customers lost electricity as heavy precipitation downed trees and power lines and caused mudslides. The disturbance left at least three people dead in Haiti. Between November 17 and November 19, the Dominican Republic Emergency Operations Center rescued over 2,500 people. Flooding damaged several bridges and roads and over 2,600 homes, while 17 were destroyed. The disturbance killed at least 21 people in the Dominican Republic. Damage in the Dominican Republic reached RD$8 billion (US$141 million). According to AON, 32 fatalities occurred from the system in the Caribbean and damages totaled approximately $605 million.

== Storm names ==
The following list of names was used for named storms that formed in the North Atlantic in 2023. This was the same list used in the 2017 season, with the exceptions of Harold, Idalia, Margot, and Nigel, which replaced Harvey, Irma, Maria, and Nate, respectively. Each of the new names was used in 2023 for the first time. This season's list will be used again in 2029, as no names were retired from it afterwards. This was the first season since 2014 to not have a name be retired.

- Arlene
- Bret
- Cindy
- Don
- Emily
- Franklin
- Gert
- Harold
- Idalia
- Jose
- Katia
- Lee
- Margot
- Nigel
- Ophelia
- Philippe
- Rina
- Sean
- Tammy
- Vince (unused)
- Whitney (unused)

== Season effects ==
This is a table of all of the storms that formed in the 2023 Atlantic hurricane season. It includes their duration, names, intensities, areas affected, damages, and death totals. Deaths in parentheses are additional and indirect (an example of an indirect death would be a traffic accident), but were still related to that storm. Damage and deaths include totals while the storm was extratropical, a wave, or a low, and all of the damage figures are in 2023 USD.

Saffir–Simpson scale
TD	TS	C1	C2	C3	C4	C5

2023 North Atlantic tropical cyclone season statistics
Storm name	Dates active	Storm category at peak intensity	Max 1-min wind mph (km/h)	Min. press. (mbar)	Areas affected	Damage (US$)	Deaths	Ref(s).
Unnamed	January 16–17	Subtropical storm	70 (110)	976	New England, Atlantic Canada	None	None	
Arlene	June 1–3	Tropical storm	40 (65)	998	Greater Antilles, Southeastern United States	$50,000	None	
Bret	June 19–24	Tropical storm	70 (110)	996	Windward Islands, Leeward Antilles, South America	$445,000	None	
Cindy	June 22–26	Tropical storm	60 (95)	1004	None	None	None	
Don	July 14–24	Category 1 hurricane	75 (120)	986	None	None	None	
Gert	August 19 – September 4	Tropical storm	60 (95)	998	None	None	None	
Emily	August 20–21	Tropical storm	50 (85)	998	None	None	None	
Franklin	August 20 – September 1	Category 4 hurricane	150 (240)	926	Lucayan Archipelago, Greater Antilles, Bermuda	$90 million	2	
Harold	August 21–23	Tropical storm	60 (95)	995	Southwestern United States, Northern Mexico	$505,000	1	
Idalia	August 26–31	Category 4 hurricane	130 (215)	942	Yucatan Peninsula, Greater Antilles, Southeastern United States, Bermuda	>$3.5 billion	8 (4)	
Jose	August 29 – September 1	Tropical storm	65 (100)	996	None	None	None	
Katia	August 31 – September 4	Tropical storm	60 (95)	998	None	None	None	
Lee	September 5–16	Category 5 hurricane	165 (270)	926	Bermuda, Northeastern United States, Atlantic Canada	$80 million	4	
Margot	September 7–16	Category 1 hurricane	90 (150)	969	None	None	None	
Nigel	September 15–22	Category 2 hurricane	100 (155)	971	None	None	None	
Ophelia	September 22–23	Tropical storm	70 (110)	981	East Coast of the United States	$450 million	None	
Philippe	September 23 – October 6	Tropical storm	60 (95)	998	Leeward Islands, Bermuda	$3.4 million	None	
Rina	September 28 – October 1	Tropical storm	50 (85)	999	None	None	None	
Sean	October 10–15	Tropical storm	45 (75)	1005	None	None	None	
Tammy	October 18–28	Category 2 hurricane	110 (175)	965	Leeward Islands, Bermuda	Minor	None	
Twenty-One	October 23–24	Tropical depression	30 (45)	1007	Central America	None	None	
Season aggregates
21 systems	January 16 – October 28		165 (270)	926		>$4.13 billion	15 (4)	

== See also ==
- Weather of 2023
- Tropical cyclones in 2023
- 2023 Pacific hurricane season
- 2023 Pacific typhoon season
- 2023 North Indian Ocean cyclone season
- South-West Indian Ocean cyclone seasons: 2022–23, 2023–24
- Australian region cyclone seasons: 2022–23, 2023–24
- South Pacific cyclone seasons: 2022–23, 2023–24
