= Hurricane Tammy =

Category 2 Atlantic hurricane in 2023

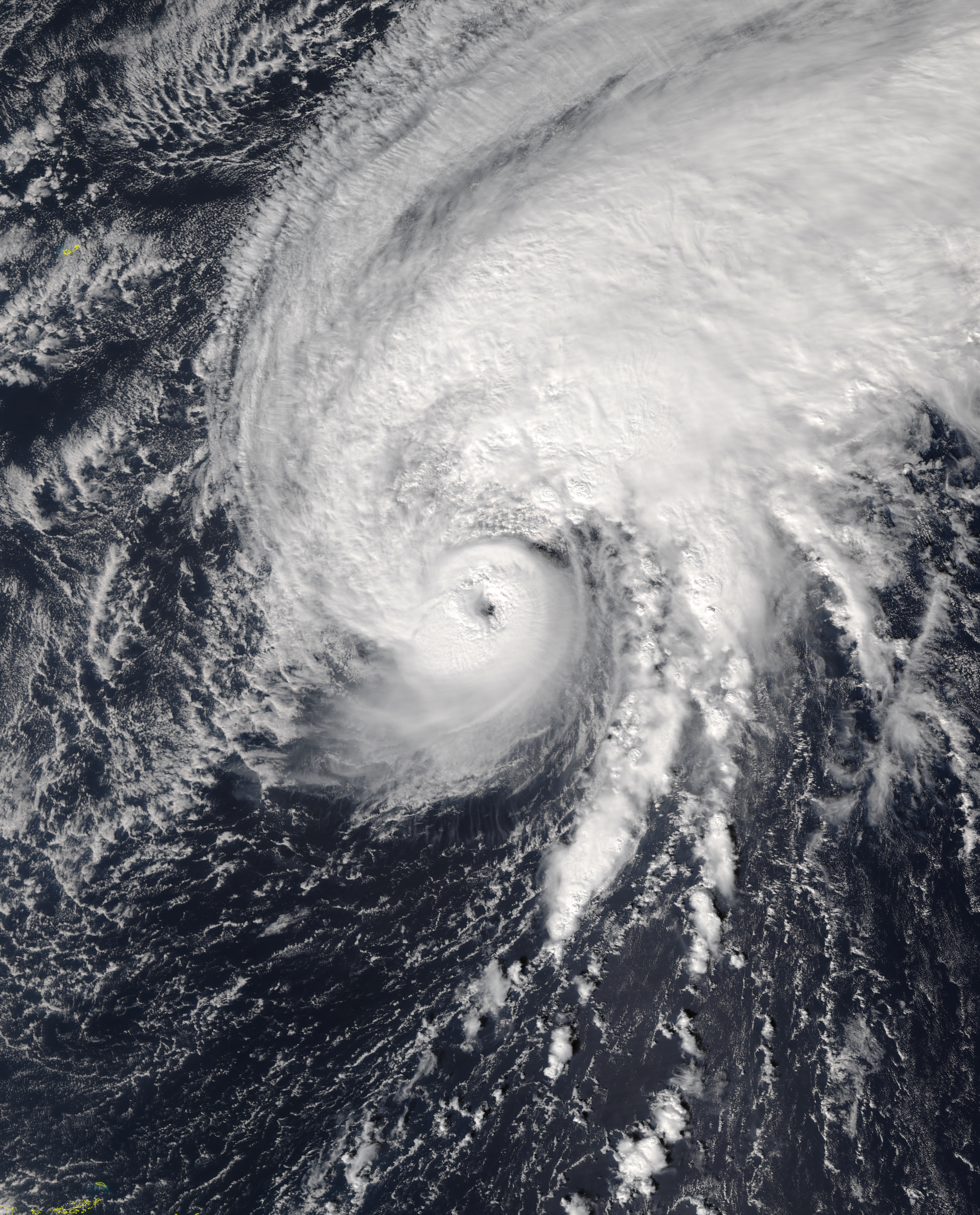
- Tammy at peak intensity north of the Leeward Islands on October 25

Meteorological history
- Formed: October 18, 2023
- Post-tropical: October 28, 2023
- Dissipated: November 1, 2023

Category 2 hurricane
- 1-minute sustained (SSHWS/NWS)
- Highest winds: 110 mph (175 km/h)
- Lowest pressure: 965 mbar (hPa); 28.50 inHg

Overall effects
- Fatalities: None
- Damage: Minimal
- Areas affected: Leeward Islands (Barbuda), Bermuda
- Part of the 2023 Atlantic hurricane season

Hurricane Tammy was a long-lived Atlantic hurricane in October 2023 that caused minor impacts across the Leeward Islands and Bermuda. The twentieth tropical storm, nineteenth named storm, and seventh hurricane of the 2023 Atlantic hurricane season, (Note: This excludes a retroactively recognized and unnamed subtropical storm in January.) Tammy originated from a late-season tropical wave off the coast of West Africa that developed into a tropical storm on October 18. Tammy became a hurricane two days later, unusually late in the season for hurricanes to develop in the tropical Atlantic. and continued to intensify, aided by record warm sea surface temperatures. The hurricane then made landfall on Barbuda the next day. Afterwards, the hurricane slowly moved northwest paralleling the Leeward Islands, remaining steady in intensity for several days. On October 25, as the system began to accelerate northeast ahead of an approaching trough, Tammy intensified and peaked as a Category 2 hurricane with maximum sustained winds of 110 mph (175 km/h). It maintained hurricane strength for five days, before weakening to a tropical storm. Tammy degenerated into a post-tropical cyclone on October 28.

Impact-wise, the storm did cause light to moderate damage in Guadeloupe, particularly La Désirade, and Barbuda while Antigua had only minor damage, though blackouts occurred across both islands. Rainfall amounts across the Leeward Islands were between 4 and 8 in (100 and 200 mm), and storm surge heights were between 1 and 3 ft (0.30 and 0.91 m). Bermuda received minor impacts with wind gusts of 40 mph (65 km/h) as Tammy passed and meandered to the east of the island. Tammy was the second storm to impact the Leeward Islands in October, after Philippe passed through the region about two weeks prior.

== Meteorological history ==
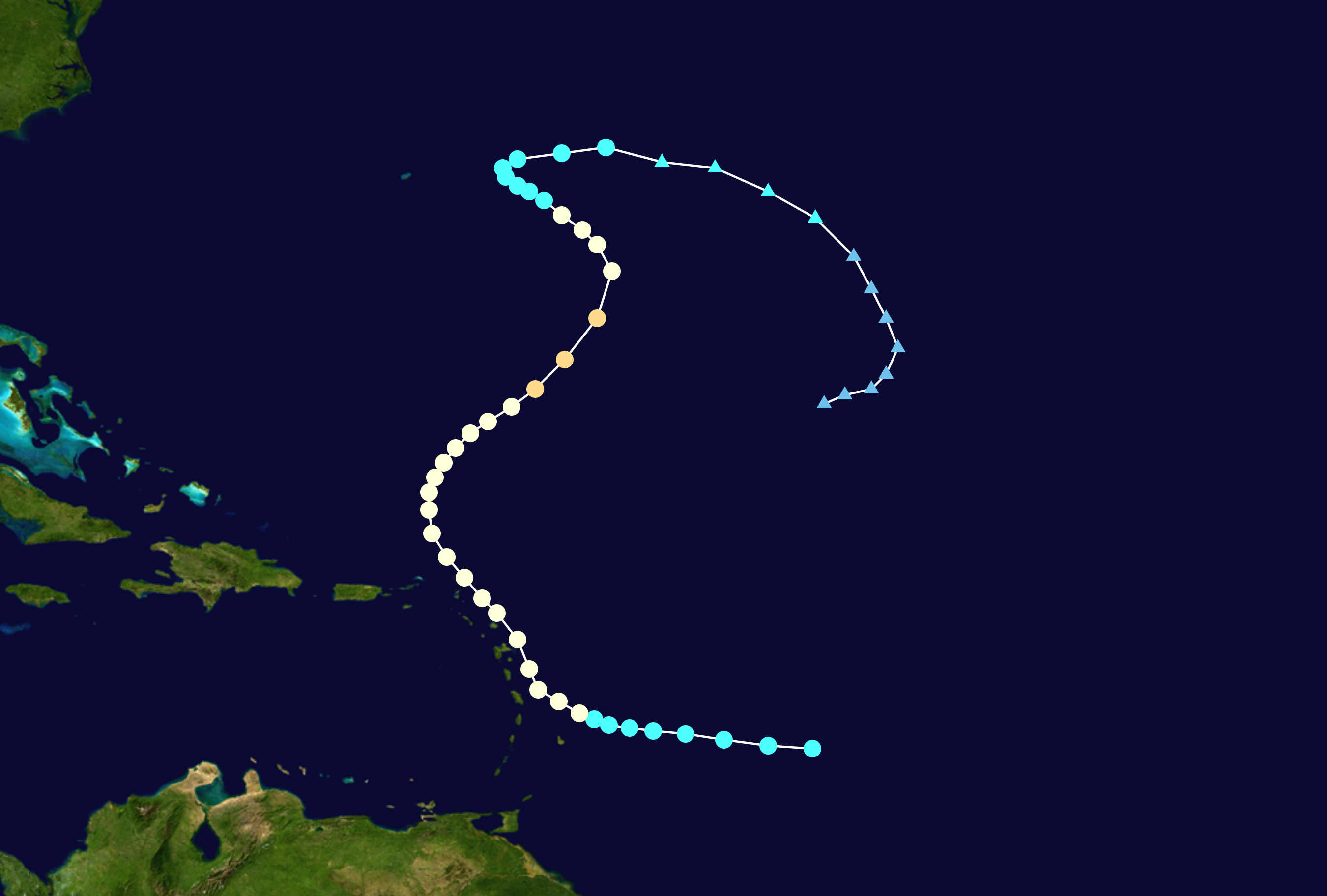
Map plotting the storm's track and intensity, according to the Saffir–Simpson scale Map key Saffir–Simpson scale Tropical depression (≤38 mph, ≤62 km/h) Tropical storm (39–73 mph, 63–118 km/h) Category 1 (74–95 mph, 119–153 km/h) Category 2 (96–110 mph, 154–177 km/h) Category 3 (111–129 mph, 178–208 km/h) Category 4 (130–156 mph, 209–251 km/h) Category 5 (≥157 mph, ≥252 km/h) Unknown Storm type Tropical cyclone Subtropical cyclone Extratropical cyclone, remnant low, tropical disturbance, or monsoon depression

On October 11, the National Hurricane Center (NHC) began monitoring a tropical wave located wave just offshore of West Africa. Showers and thunderstorms associated with the disturbance became more concentrated and better organized on October 14, but nearby dry air managed to infiltrate the system, suppressing convection to some degree. Later, when environmental conditions became more conducive, thunderstorm activity within the disturbance was able to become more organized on October 17. The following afternoon, satellite imagery indicated a well-defined low-level surface circulation, prompting the NHC to designate the system as Tropical Storm Tammy. Despite having a sheared appearance due to light to moderate westerly vertical wind shear, hurricane hunter data indicated that Tammy was strengthening as it moved quickly westward through record-warm sea surface temperatures towards the Leeward Islands on October 19. The following morning on October 20, Tammy's inner core became better organized the following morning. Radar imagery showed that strong convection had quickly evolved into a curved band, and a closed eye. Meanwhile, aircraft data showed that its central pressure had fallen quickly, and sustained winds increased. As a result, the storm was upgraded to a Category 1 hurricane. Later, Tammy passed to the east-southeast of Guadeloupe, and then at 01:15 UTC on October 22, made landfall on Barbuda at its initial peak intensity with sustained winds of 90 mph (150 km/h).

Tammy pulled away from the Leeward Islands throughout the day, though heavy rains still impacted the islands. After weakening to a minimal hurricane while struggling against wind shear for a couple of days, Tammy began to strengthen on October 25 due to increasing upper-level divergence associated with a deep-layer trough. Later that day, it intensified into a Category 2 hurricane and reached its peak intensity with maximum sustained winds of 110 mph (175 km/h). Shortly after peaking, Tammy then began to interact with a front to its north, which caused the hurricane to begin its transition to an extratropical cyclone. It did not fully merge with the front and remained a tropical cyclone, although operationally the NHC declared it extratropical on October 26, then restarted advisories on October 27 east of Bermuda. Not long afterward though, environmental conditions became adverse. Strong vertical wind shear and dry air entrainment quickly stripped the storm of its convection, and it became a remnant low on October 29.

== Preparations and impacts ==
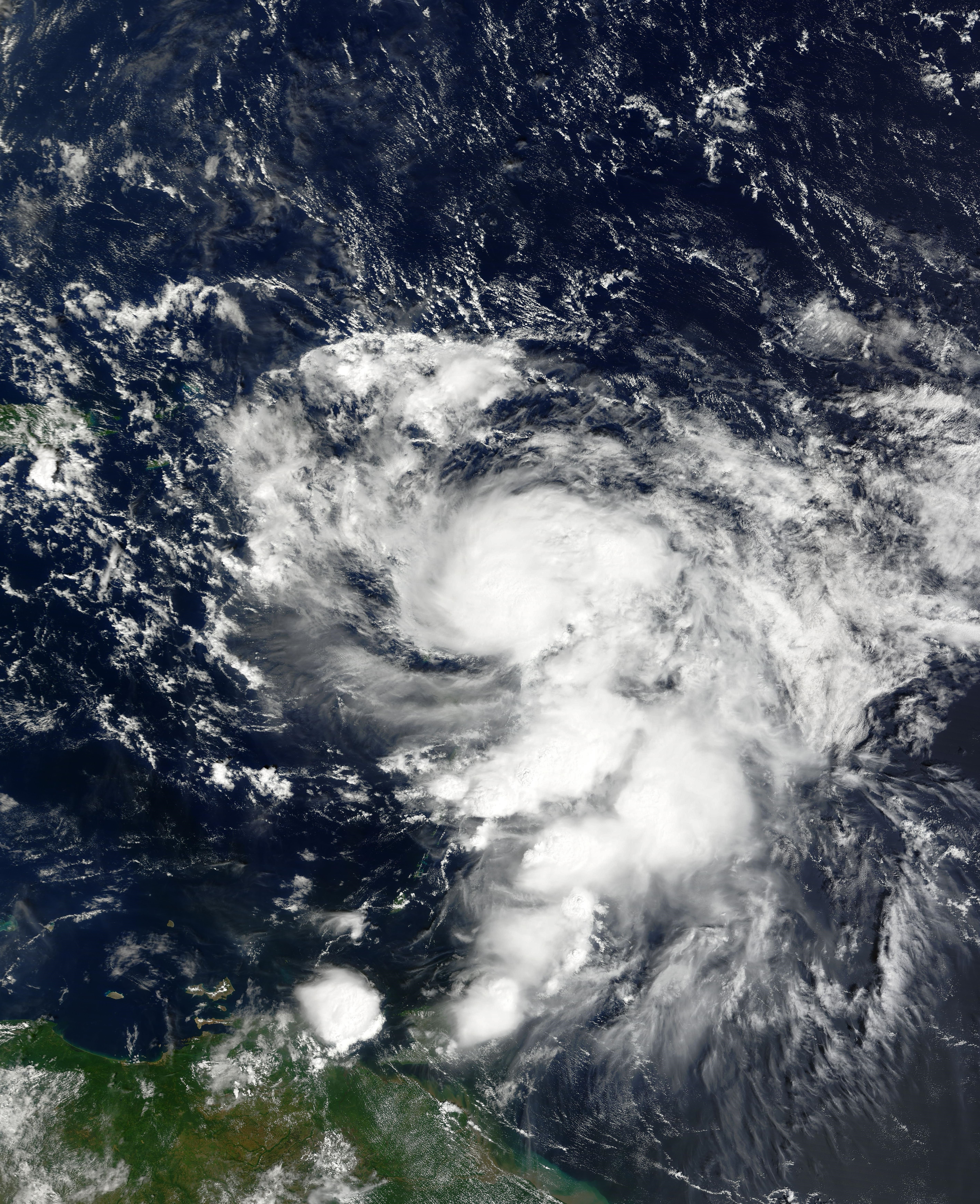
Hurricane Tammy nearing Barbuda on October 21

=== Caribbean ===
Hurricane warnings were issued for Antigua and Barbuda, Guadeloupe, Montserrat, Saint Kitts and Nevis, Anguilla, Saint Martin, and Saint Barthélemy. Sint Maarten closed their airport and businesses and the Ministry of Defense requested for soldiers to aid citizens after Tammy passed. Prime Minister Silveria Jacobs requested people to shelter in place. The island kept its schools closed till October 23. The British Virgin Islands cleaned roadways. The people of the islands stockpiled of supplies. District representatives were given permission to issue emergency crews in their districts.

Rainfall amounts across the islands were between 4 and 8 in (100 and 200 mm), and storm surge heights were between 1 and 3 ft (0.30 and 0.91 m). Though in close proximity to the storm, Dominica did not experienced hurricane strength winds. Some landslides did occur due to intense rains from Tammy. Sint Maartin and Sint Eustatius only experienced heavy rains and cloud cover. In the aftermath, Sint Maarten still had experienced some flooded roads and rough surf.

==== Guadeloupe ====
Guadeloupe issued a vigilance violet, schools were closed and movement prohibited. An emergency shelter was opened up in Guadeloupe. The island mobilized 600 gendarmes, 200 firefighters, and a hundred police.

The principle islands of Guadeloupe were not impacted with the strongest winds from Tammy. However, La Désirade experienced winds of 90 miles per hour (140 km/h) that caused moderate damage with numerous uprooted trees, some roof damage and traffic signs washed away; also, up to 80% of the island was in a blackout during the peak of the hurricane. Debris were also found across La Desirade, and was mostly the sum of all the damages from Tammy on the island. According to Météo-France, 3.7 inches (94 mm) of rain fell in Saint-Claude and Vieux-Habitants, 3.3 inches (84 mm) in Capesterre-Belle-Eau, and 3.1 inches (79 mm) in Sainte-Anne and Petit-Bourg. Rivers in southern Basse-Terre left their courses, most notably Grande Ravine in Le Gosier, Baie-Mahault, Sainte-Marie de Capesterre-Belle-Eau, and Petit-Bourg; Grande Rivière à Goyaves and the Géry in Vieux-Habitants. Trois-Rivières, Baillif, Vieux-Fort, and the River Sens in Gourbeyre had river flooding up to their piers. A landslip occurred in Saint-Claude that carried cars 30 meters (98 ft) down a hill and buried them. Potable water plants went out of circuit and power outages were reported.

==== Antigua and Barbuda ====
Tammy made landfall on Barbuda, the second system in two weeks to do so, in addition to Tropical Storm Philippe. Barbuda was left with minimal damage. At least two families had to be evacuated. Meanwhile, on Antigua, the only damages reported were broken branches and powerlines. Blackouts occurred across both islands, but mostly on Barbuda where the entire island experienced a blackout.

=== Bermuda ===
Bermuda was buffeted with wind gusts of 40 mph (65 km/h) late on October 26, resulting in the issuing of a gale warning.

=== Elsewhere ===
The East Coast of the United States was impacted with minor swells due to a large pressure gradient from Tammy and a high-pressure on the East Coast.

== See also ==
- Weather of 2023
- Tropical cyclones in 2023
- Timeline of the 2023 Atlantic hurricane season
- Hurricane Jose (1999) – a Category 2 hurricane with a very similar path, that affected the northern Leeward Islands
- Hurricane Jose (2017) – a Category 4 hurricane that took a similar path but ultimately missed the Leeward Islands
- Tropical Storm Philippe (2023) – a weaker system which impacted the northern Leeward Islands nineteen days prior to Tammy
