= Timeline of the 2023 Atlantic hurricane season =

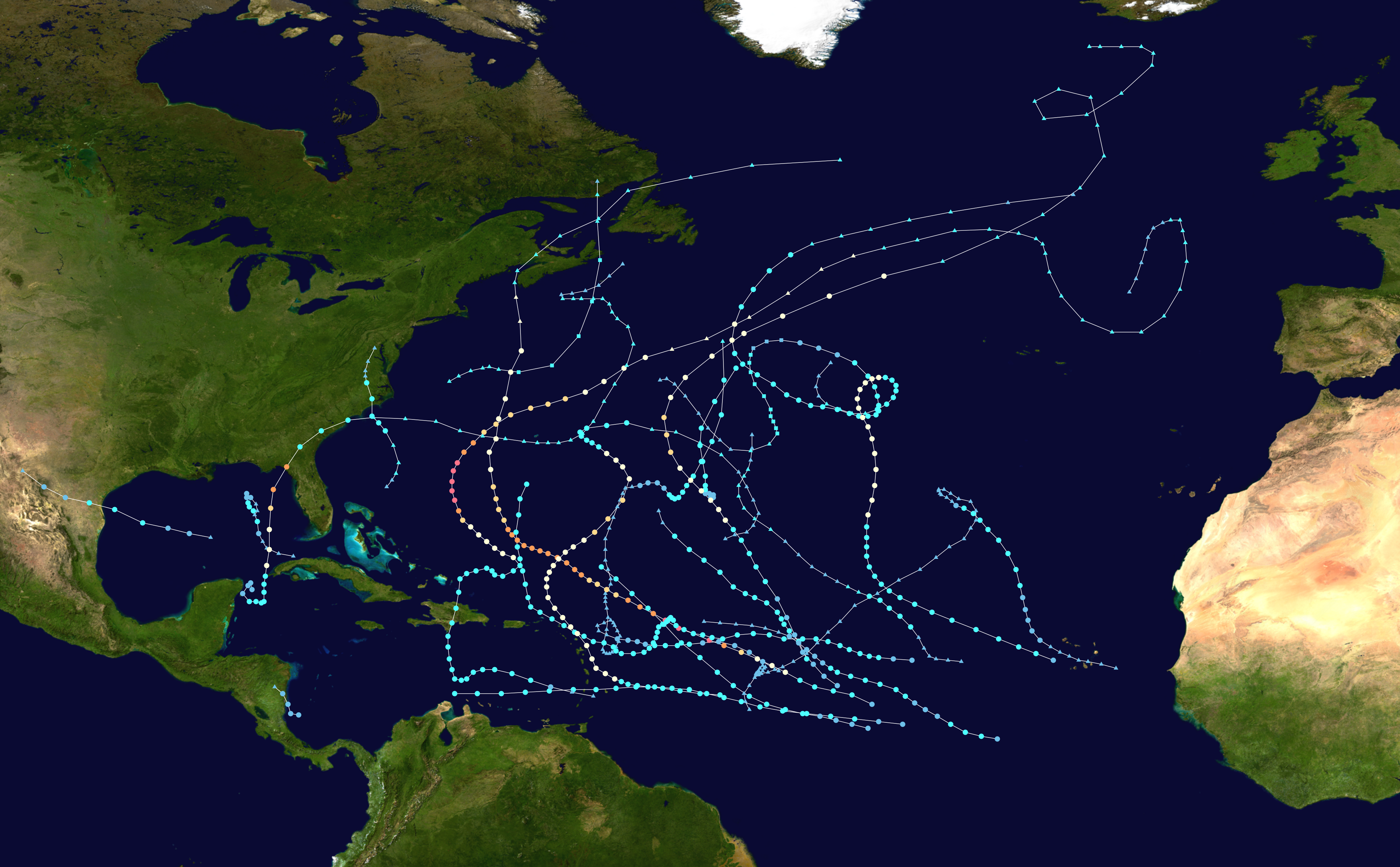
- Season summary map

Season boundaries
- First system formed: January 16, 2023
- Last system dissipated: October 28, 2023

Strongest system
- Name: Lee
- Maximum winds: 165 mph (270 km/h) (1-minute sustained)
- Lowest pressure: 926 mbar (hPa; 27.35 inHg)

Longest lasting system
- Name: Philippe
- Duration: 13.25 days
Storm articles
- Tropical Storm Bret (2023)
- Hurricane Franklin (2023)
- Tropical Storm Harold
- Hurricane Idalia
- Hurricane Lee (2023)
- Tropical Storm Ophelia (2023)
- Tropical Storm Philippe (2023)
- Hurricane Tammy

The 2023 Atlantic hurricane season saw an above average number of named storms and an average number of hurricanes and major hurricanes (category 3 or higher on the 5-level Saffir–Simpson wind speed scale). There were twenty named storms during the season; (Note: The total includes an unnamed, belatedly recognized subtropical storm in January.) seven of them strengthened into hurricanes, and three of those reached major hurricane intensity. The season officially began on June 1, 2023, and ended on November 30. These dates, adopted by convention, historically describe the period in each year when most subtropical or tropical cyclones form in the Atlantic. However, tropical cyclone formation is possible at any time of the year, as was the case this season, when an unnamed subtropical storm formed on January 16. The last system to dissipate was Hurricane Tammy, on October 28.

This timeline documents tropical cyclone formations, strengthening, weakening, landfalls, extratropical transitions, and dissipations during the season. It includes information that was not released throughout the season, meaning that data from post-storm reviews by the National Hurricane Center, such as a storm that was not initially warned upon, has been included.

The time stamp for each event is first stated using Coordinated Universal Time (UTC), the 24-hour clock where 00:00 = midnight UTC. The NHC uses both UTC and the time zone where the center of the tropical cyclone is currently located. The time zones utilized (east to west) are: Greenwich, Cape Verde, Atlantic, Eastern, and Central. In this timeline, the respective area time is included in parentheses. Additionally, figures for maximum sustained winds and position estimates are rounded to the nearest 5 units (miles, or kilometers), following National Hurricane Center practice. Direct wind observations are rounded to the nearest whole number. Atmospheric pressures are listed to the nearest millibar and nearest hundredth of an inch of mercury.

== Timeline ==
=== January ===
January 16

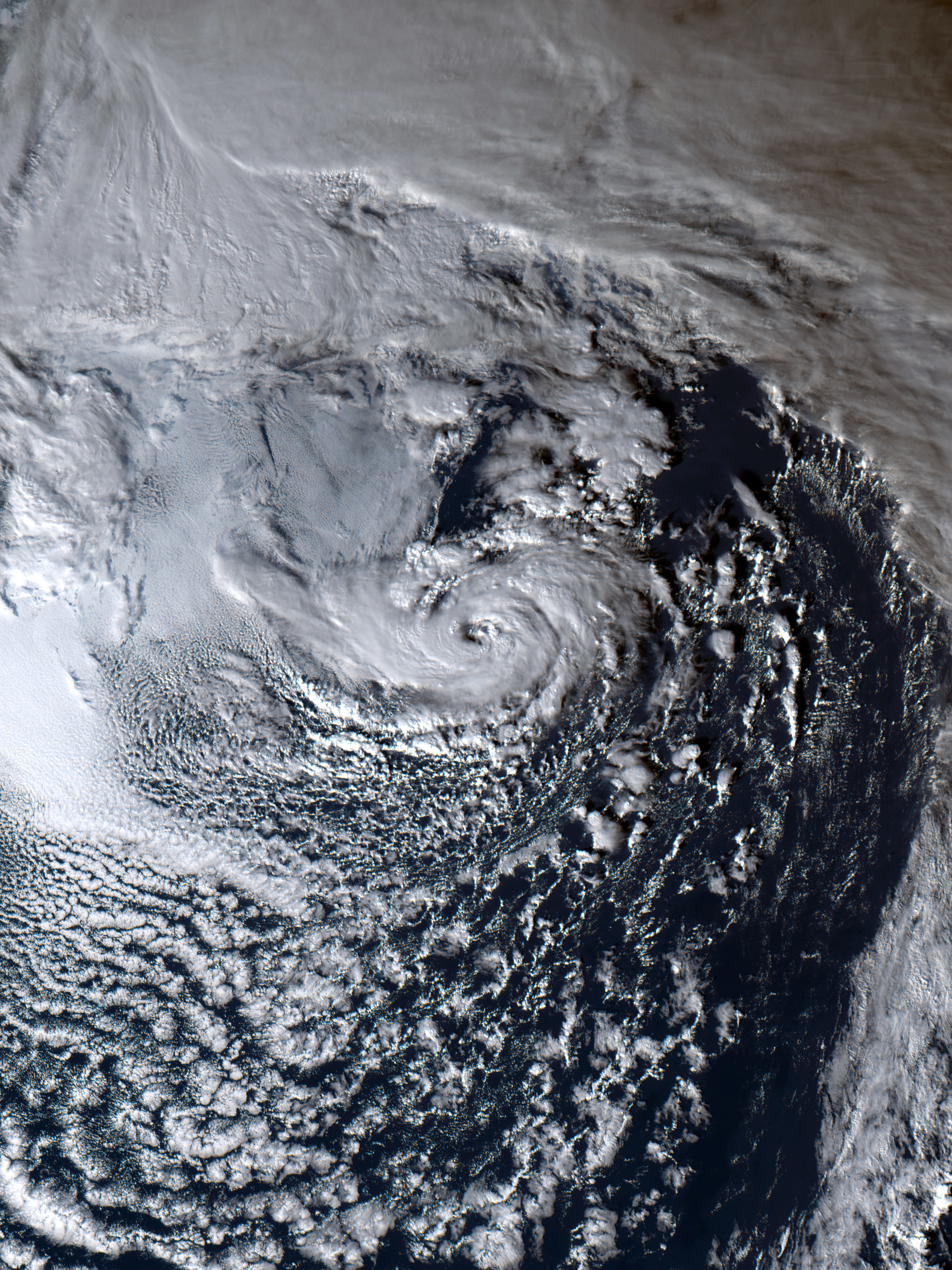
The unnamed subtropical storm off the coast of New England on January 16

- 12:00 UTC (8:00 a.m. AST) at 37.1°N 66.1°W – A subtropical storm forms about 345 mi (555 km) southeast of Nantucket, Massachusetts. (Note: This system was not given the subtropical storm designation by the National Hurricane Center until May 11, 2023, following a review of data gathered on it operationally. While retroactively recognized as the first storm of the 2023 Atlantic hurricane season, it was not given a name.)

January 17

- 00:00 UTC (8:00 p.m. AST, January 16) at 39.8°N 61.6°W – The unnamed subtropical storm reaches peak intensity with maximum sustained winds of 70 mph (110 km/h) and a minimum central pressure of 976 mbar (28.82 inHg), about 345 mi (555 km) south-southeast of Halifax, Nova Scotia.
- 12:45 UTC (8:45 a.m. AST) at 45.9°N 60.0°W – The unnamed subtropical storm makes landfall at Louisbourg, Nova Scotia, with sustained winds of 50 mph (85 km/h).
- 18:00 UTC (2:00 p.m. AST) at 48.4°N 60.2°W – The unnamed subtropical storm transitions to a post-tropical low south of the coast of far eastern Quebec, and subsequently dissipates.

=== June ===
June 1

- The Atlantic hurricane season officially begins.
- 12:00 UTC (7:00 a.m. CDT) at 27.7°N 86.2°W – Tropical Depression Two forms off the western coast of Florida.

June 2

- 18:00 UTC (1:00 p.m. CDT) at 27.3°N 86.4°W – Tropical Depression Two strengthens into Tropical Storm Arlene.

June 3

- 00:00 UTC (7:00 p.m. CDT, June 2) at 25.9°N 85.7°W – Tropical Storm Arlene reaches peak intensity with maximum sustained winds of 40 mph (65 km/h) and a minimum central pressure of 998 mbar (29.47 inHg).
- 06:00 UTC (1:00 a.m. CDT) at 25.0°N 85.6°W – Tropical Storm Arlene weakens to a tropical depression.
- 12:00 UTC (8:00 a.m. EDT) at 24.4°N 85.3°W – Tropical Depression Arlene degenerates into a remnant low, and subsequently dissipates.

June 19

- 06:00 UTC (2:00 a.m. AST) at 10.7°N 37.3°W – Tropical Depression Three forms from a tropical wave about 1,495 mi (2,410 km) east of Barbados.
- 18:00 UTC (2:00 p.m. AST) at 11.1°N 40.9°W – Tropical Depression Three strengthens into Tropical Storm Bret about 1,100 mi (1,770 km) east of Barbados.

June 22

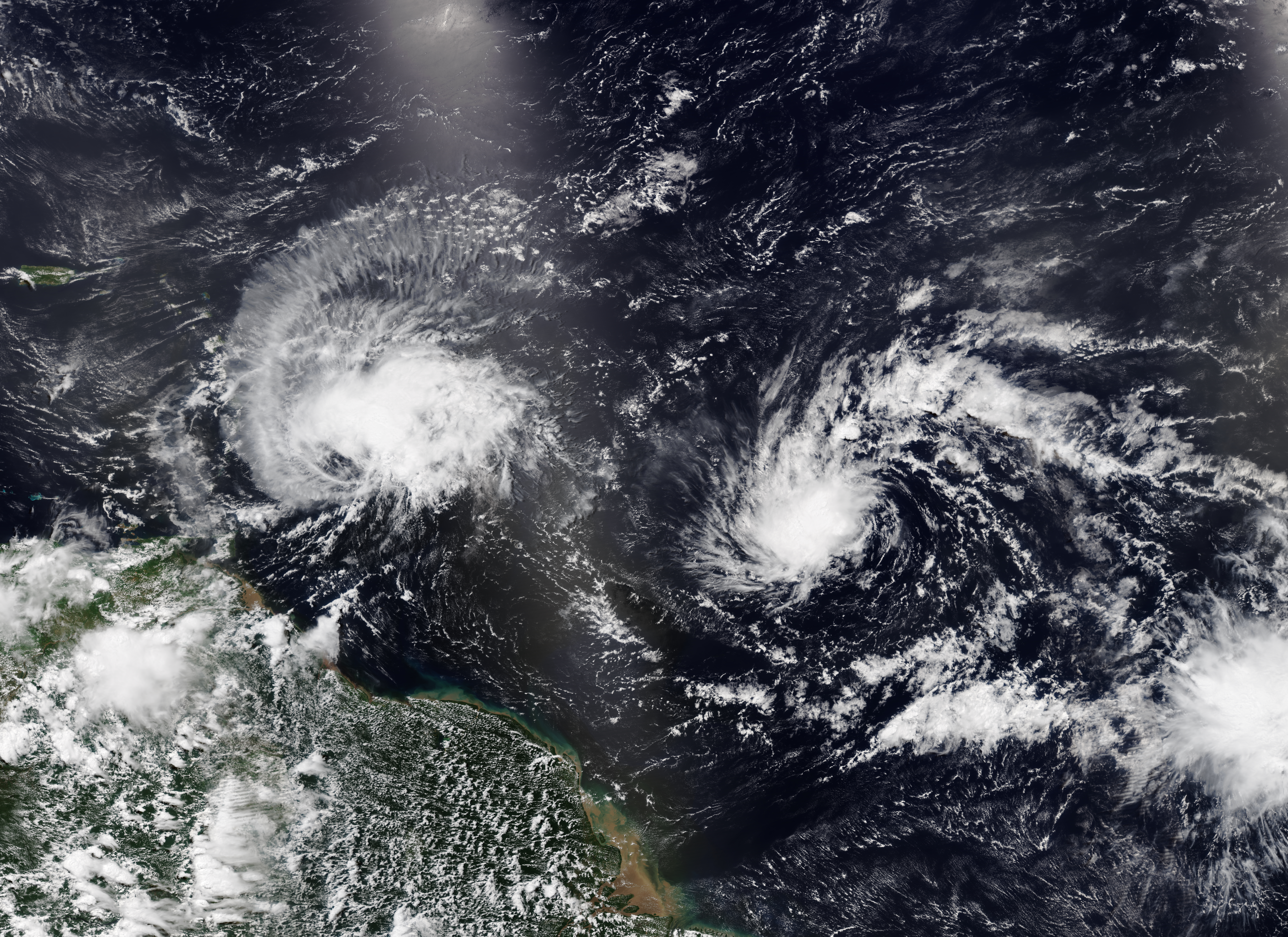
Tropical Storm Bret (left) and Tropical Depression Four (right) approaching the Windward Islands on June 22

- 00:00 UTC (8:00 p.m. AST, June 21) at 10.4°N 39.9°W – Tropical Depression Four forms from a tropical wave over the central tropical Atlantic.
- 06:00 UTC (2:00 a.m. AST) at 13.5°N 55.9°W – Tropical Storm Bret reaches peak intensity with maximum sustained winds of 70 mph (110 km/h) and a minimum central pressure of 996 mbar (29.41 inHg), east of Barbados.

June 23

- 00:00 UTC (8:00 p.m. AST, June 22) at 11.5°N 44.8°W – Tropical Depression Four strengthens into Tropical Storm Cindy east of the Lesser Antilles.
- 03:15 UTC (2:15 a.m. AST) at 13.3°N 61.2°W – Tropical Storm Bret makes landfall with sustained winds of 65 mph (100 km/h) on Saint Vincent, Saint Vincent and the Grenadines.

June 24

- 06:00 UTC (2:00 a.m. AST) at 14.6°N 51.2°W – Tropical Storm Cindy reaches peak intensity with maximum sustained winds of 50 mph (80 km/h) and a minimum central pressure of 1004 mbar (29.65 inHg).
- 12:00 UTC (8:00 a.m. EDT) at 13.0°N 70.9°W – Tropical Storm Bret opens into a trough about 70 mi (110 km) northwest of Aruba, and subsequently dissipates.

June 26

- 03:00 UTC (11:00 p.m. AST, June 25) at 22.8°N 60.0°W – Tropical Storm Cindy degenerates to an open wave about 375 mi (605 km) north-northeast of the Northern Leeward Islands. (Note: The National Hurricane Center continued to monitor Cindy's remnants until June 28 due to potential for regeneration.)

=== July ===
July 14

- 00:00 UTC (8:00 p.m. AST, July 13) at 32.5°N 46.7°W – Subtropical Storm Don forms from an area of low pressure about 1,180 mi (1,900 km) southwest of the Azores.

July 16

- 12:00 UTC (8:00 a.m. AST) at 38.9°N 48.5°W – Subtropical Storm Don weakens to a subtropical depression about 1,150 mi (1,850 km) west of the Azores.

July 17

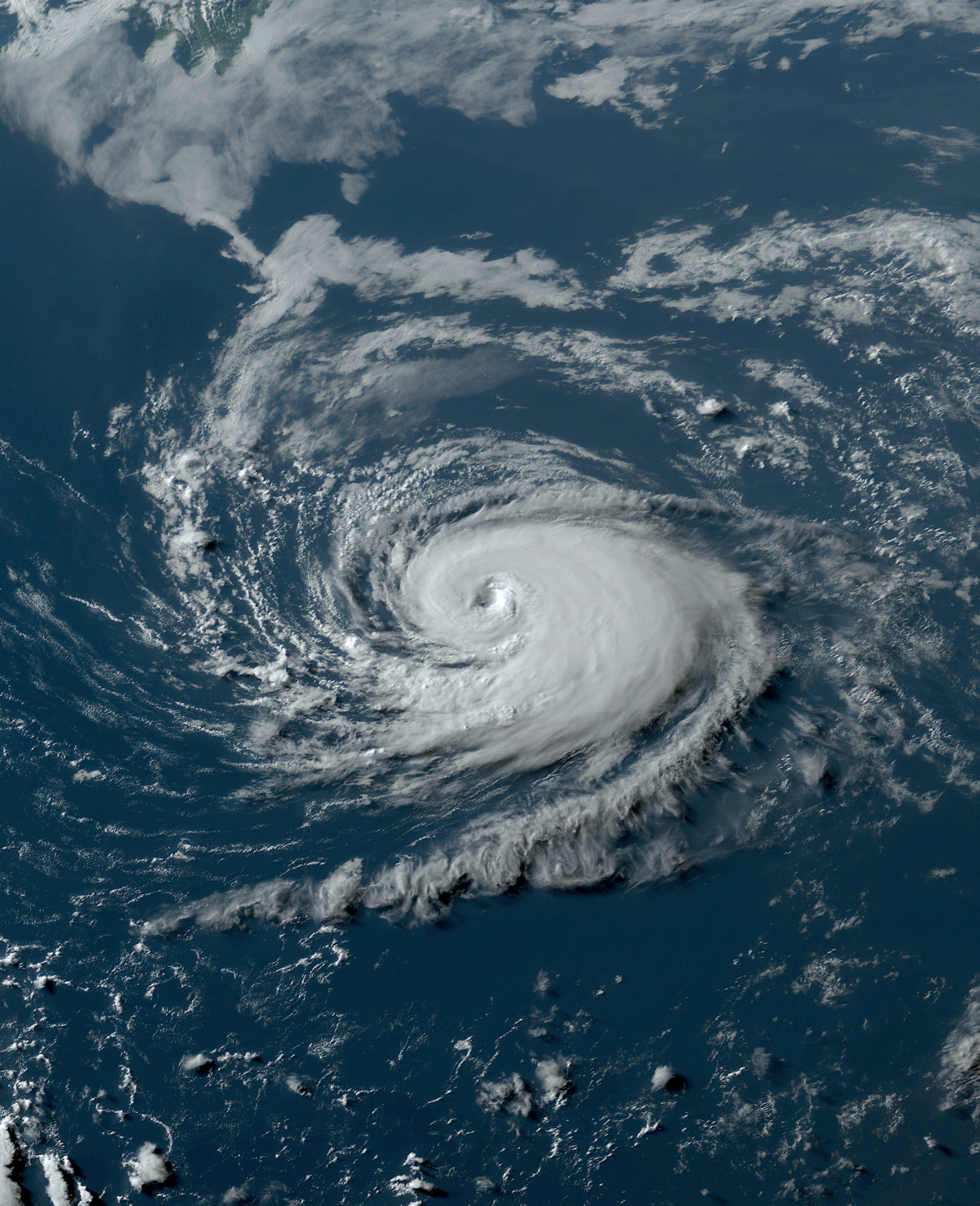
Hurricane Don off the coast of Atlantic Canada on July 22

- 06:00 UTC (6:00 a.m. GMT) at 39.3°N 45.0°W – Subtropical Depression Don transitions to a tropical depression about 960 mi (1,545 km) west of the Azores.

July 18

- 00:00 UTC (12:00 a.m. GMT) at 37.8°N 40.9°W – Tropical Depression Don strengthens into a tropical storm about 750 mi (1,205 km) west of the Azores.

July 22

- 18:00 UTC (2:00 p.m. AST) at 39.5°N 50.1°W – Tropical Storm Don strengthens into a Category 1 hurricane and simultaneously reaches peak intensity with maximum sustained winds of 75 mph (120 km/h) and a minimum central pressure of 986 mbar (29.12 inHg), about 1,230 mi (1,980 km) west-northwest of the Azores.

July 23

- 06:00 UTC (5:00 a.m. AST) at 42.0°N 49.4°W – Hurricane Don weakens to a tropical storm about 1,190 mi (1,915 km) northwest of the Azores.

July 24

- 06:00 UTC (6:00 a.m. GMT) at 46.7°N 44.1°W – Tropical Storm Don transitions to a post-tropical cyclone about 1,020 mi (1,640 km) northwest of the Azores.

=== August ===
August 19

- 06:00 UTC (2:00 a.m. AST) at 15.4°N 47.8°W – Tropical Depression Six forms from a tropical wave east of the northern Leeward Islands.

August 20

- 00:00 UTC (8:00 p.m. AST, August 19) at 18.0°N 36.7°W – Tropical Storm Emily forms from a tropical wave over the open tropical Atlantic.
- 12:00 UTC (8:00 a.m. AST) at 19.4°N 38.3°W – Tropical Storm Emily reaches peak intensity with maximum sustained winds of 50 mph (85 km/h) and a minimum central pressure of 998 mbar (29.47 inHg).
- 12:00 UTC (8:00 a.m. AST) at 16.7°N 53.5°W – Tropical Depression Six strengthens into Tropical Storm Gert east of the northern Leeward Islands.
- 21:00 UTC (5:00 p.m. AST) at 14.6°N 67.1°W – Tropical Storm Franklin forms from an area of low pressure about 270 mi (435 km) south-southeast of Isla Saona, Dominican Republic.

August 21

- 06:00 UTC (2:00 a.m. AST) at 20.6°N 40.6°W – Tropical Storm Emily degenerates to a remnant low. (Note: The National Hurricane Center continued to monitor Emily's remnants until August 25 due to potential for regeneration.)
- 12:00 UTC (8:00 a.m. AST) at 17.1°N 57.5°W – Tropical Storm Gert weakens to a tropical depression about 375 mi (605 km) east of the northern Leeward Islands.
- 18:00 UTC (6:00 p.m. CDT) at 25.0°N 90.8°W – Tropical Depression Nine forms about 415 mi (665 km) east of Brownsville, Texas, from a tropical wave. (Note: Due to the threat the developing system posed to south Texas, the National Hurricane Center initiated advisories on it, designating it Potential Tropical Cyclone Nine at 15:00 UTC (10:00 a.m. CDT) on August 21.)

August 22

- 06:00 UTC (1:00 a.m. CDT) at 25.8°N 94.3°W – Tropical Depression Nine strengthens into Tropical Storm Harold about 190 mi (305 km) east of Brownsville.
- 12:00 UTC (8:00 a.m. AST) at 17.4°N 59.5°W – Tropical Depression Gert degenerates to a remnant low east-southeast of the northern Leeward Islands.
- 15:00 UTC (10:00 a.m. CDT) at 27.1°N 97.4°W – Tropical Storm Harold reaches peak intensity with maximum sustained winds of 60 mph (95 km/h) and a minimum central pressure of 995 mbar (29.38 inHg), and simultaneously makes landfall at Big Shell Beach, Padre Island, Texas.

August 23

- 00:00 UTC (7:00 p.m. CDT, August 22) at 27.7°N 100.1°W – Tropical Storm Harold weakens to a tropical depression over northeastern Mexico.
- 12:00 UTC (8:00 a.m. EDT) at 17.9°N 71.2°W – Tropical Storm Franklin makes landfall with sustained winds of 50 mph (85 km/h), about 25 miles (40 km) south-southwest of Barahona, Dominican Republic.
- 12:00 UTC (7:00 a.m. CDT) at 29.7°N 103.7°W – Tropical Depression Harold degenerates to a remnant low over the Big Bend region of Texas and later dissipates.

August 26

- 12:00 UTC (7:00 a.m. CDT) at 20.8°N 86.1°W – Tropical Depression Ten forms from a disturbance that originated in the eastern Pacific Ocean about 45 mi (75 km) east-southeast of Cancún, Quintana Roo.
- 15:00 UTC (11:00 a.m. AST) at 23.5°N 66.7°W – Tropical Storm Franklin strengthens into a Category 1 hurricane about 315 mi (505 km) east-northeast of Grand Turk Island.

August 27

- 06:00 UTC (1:00 a.m. CDT) at 20.5°N 86.8°W – Tropical Depression Ten makes land fall on Cozumel.
- 12:00 UTC (7:00 a.m. CDT) at 19.9°N 86.3°W – Tropical Depression Ten strengthens into Tropical Storm Idalia about 50 mi (85 km) southeast of Cozumel.
- 15:00 UTC (11:00 a.m. AST) at 25.1°N 69.3°W – Hurricane Franklin intensifies to Category 2 strength about 275 mi (445 km) north-northeast of Grand Turk Island.

August 28

- 09:00 UTC (5:00 a.m. EDT) at 27.2°N 70.8°W – Hurricane Franklin intensifies to Category 3 strength about 395 mi (635 km) north of Grand Turk Island.
- 11:35 UTC (7:35 a.m. EDT) at 27.4°N 70.8°W – Hurricane Franklin intensifies to Category 4 strength about 405 mi (650 km) north of Grand Turk Island.

August 29

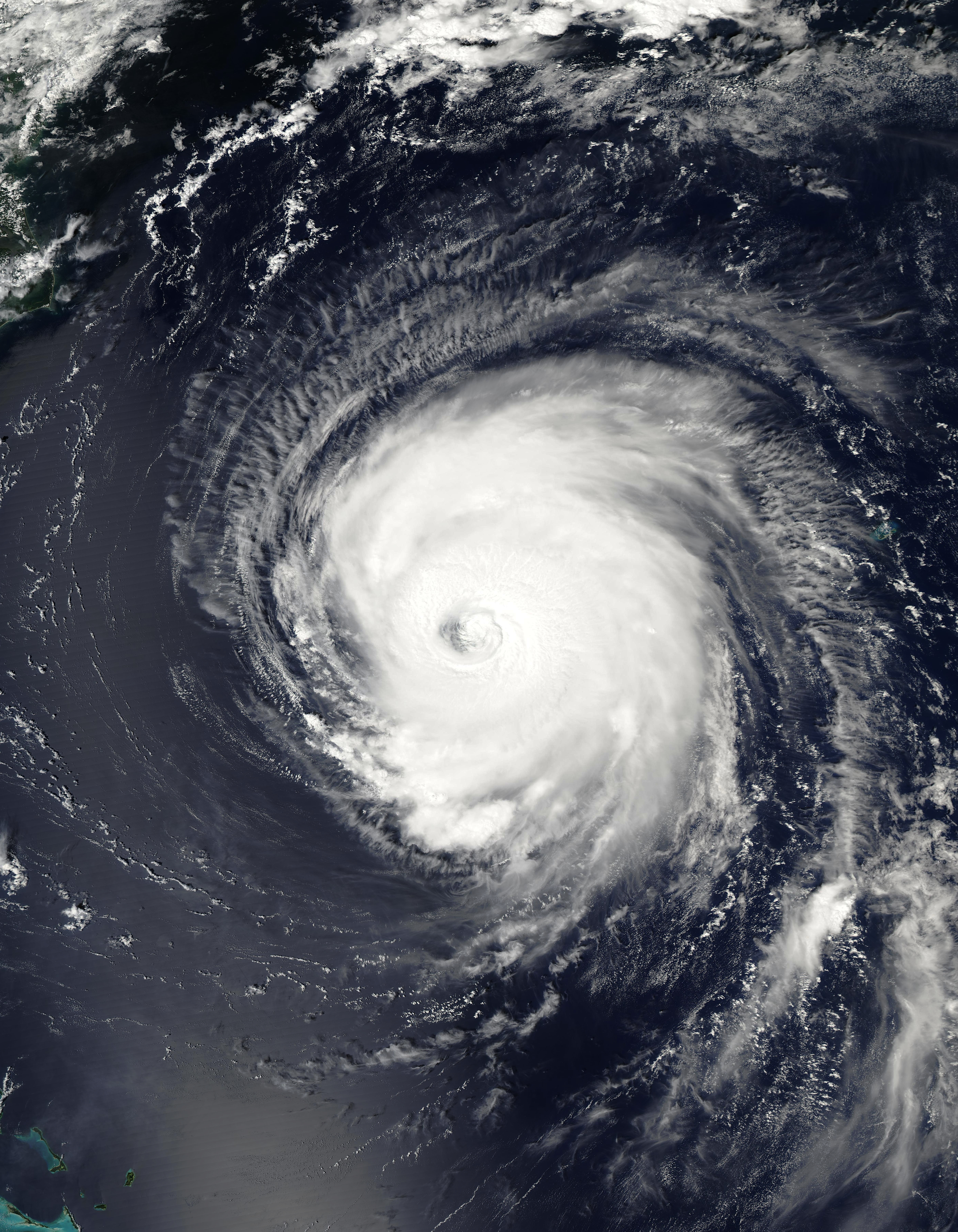
Hurricane Franklin displaying annular characteristics on August 29

- 00:00 UTC (8:00 p.m. EDT, August 28) at 29.0°N 71.1°W – Hurricane Franklin reaches peak intensity with maximum sustained winds of 150 mph (240 km/h) and a minimum central pressure of 926 mbar (27.34 inHg), about 440 mi (710 km) west-southwest of Bermuda.
- 00:00 UTC (8:00 p.m. AST, August 28) at 27.7°N 51.7°W – Tropical Depression Eleven forms over the central subtropical Atlantic from a tropical wave.
- 06:00 UTC (1:00 a.m. CDT) at 22.6°N 85.0°W – Tropical Storm Idalia strengthens into a Category 1 hurricane about 55 mi (90 km) north of the western tip of Cuba.
- 18:00 UTC (2:00 p.m. EDT) at 31.0°N 70.2°W – Hurricane Franklin weakens to Category 3 strength about 330 mi (530 km) west-southwest of Bermuda.

August 30

- 00:00 UTC (8:00 p.m. EDT) at 26.9°N 84.7°W – Hurricane Idalia intensifies to Category 2 strength about 125 mi (205 km) west of Tampa, Florida.
- 06:00 UTC (2:00 a.m. EDT) at 28.3°N 84.5°W – Hurricane Idalia intensifies to Category 3 strength about 100 mi (155 km) southwest of Cedar Key, Florida.
- 09:00 UTC (5:00 a.m. EDT) at 29.1°N 84.1°W – Hurricane Idalia intensifies to Category 4 strength and simultaneously reaches peak intensity with maximum sustained winds of 130 mph (215 km/h) and a minimum central pressure of 942 mbar (27.82 inHg), about 90 mi (150 km) south of Tallahassee, Florida.
- 09:00 UTC (5:00 a.m. AST) at 33.0°N 68.2°W – Hurricane Franklin weakens to Category 2 strength about 205 mi (330 km) west-northwest of Bermuda.
- 11:45 UTC (7:45 a.m. EDT) at 29.9°N 83.6°W – Hurricane Idalia makes landfall at Category 3 strength with sustained winds of 115 mph (185 km/h), near Keaton Beach, Florida.
- 18:00 UTC (2:00 p.m. EDT) at 31.5°N 82.5°W – Hurricane Idalia weakens to a tropical storm near Waycross, Georgia.

August 31

- 00:00 UTC (8:00 p.m. AST, August 30) at 28.3°N 52.1°W – Tropical Depression Eleven strengthens into Tropical Storm Jose.
- 12:00 UTC (8:00 a.m. EDT) at 33.7°N 77.0°W – Tropical Storm Idalia transitions to an extratropical cyclone about 60 mi (95 km) east of Cape Fear, North Carolina.
- 18:00 UTC (2:00 p.m. AST) at 28.6°N 57.0°W – Remnants of Gert re-develop into a tropical depression far north of the Leeward Islands.
- 18:00 UTC (5:00 p.m. CVT) at 17.0°N 27.0°W – Tropical Depression Twelve forms from a tropical wave near Cabo Verde.
- 21:00 UTC (5:00 p.m. AST) at 36.0°N 60.1°W – Hurricane Franklin weakens to Category 1 strength about 370 mi (595 km) northeast of Bermuda.

=== September ===
September 1

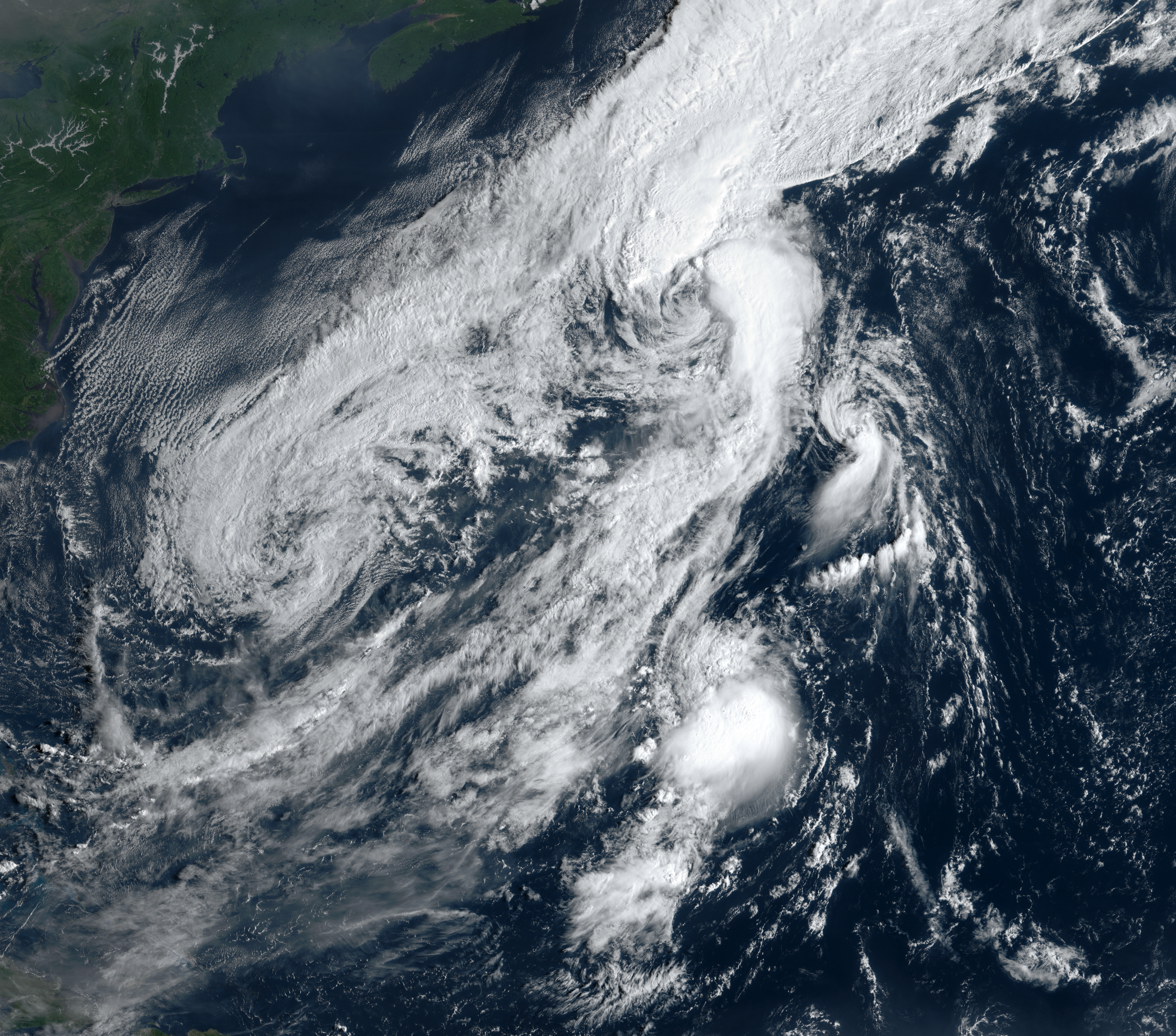
Three tropical cyclones, Franklin (top center), Gert (bottom center), and Jose (right), simultaneously active in the open Atlantic on September 1; Post‑Tropical Cyclone Idalia (left) is also visible

- 00:00 UTC (8:00 p.m. AST, August 13) at 31.6°N 52.5°W – Tropical Storm Jose reaches peak intensity with maximum sustained winds of 65 mph (100 km/h) and a minimum central pressure of 996 mbar (29.41 inHg).
- 18:00 UTC (2:00 p.m. AST) at 27.9°N 54.8°W – Tropical Depression Gert re-strengthens to a tropical storm.
- 18:00 UTC (2:00 p.m. AST) at 37.4°N 49.8°W – Tropical Storm Jose becomes absorbed into Post‑Tropical Cyclone Franklin.
- 21:00 UTC (5:00 p.m. AST) at 39.5°N 53.8°W – Hurricane Franklin transitions to an extratropical cyclone about 790 mi (1,270 km) northeast of Bermuda. (Note: The National Hurricane Center continued to monitor ex-Franklin until September 7 due to potential for regeneration.)

September 2

- 00:00 UTC (11:00 p.m. CVT, September 1) at 21.1°N 28.5°W – Tropical Depression Twelve strengthens into Tropical Storm Katia.
- 18:00 UTC (2:00 p.m. AST) at 24.5°N 30.1°W – Tropical Storm Katia reaches peak intensity with maximum sustained winds of 60 mph (95 km/h) and a minimum central pressure of 998 mbar (29.47 inHg).

September 3

- 00:00 UTC (8:00 p.m. AST, September 2) at 28.6°N 58.5°W – Tropical Storm Gert reaches peak intensity with maximum sustained winds of 60 mph (95 km/h) and a minimum central pressure of 998 mbar (29.47 inHg).

September 4

- 00:00 UTC (12:00 a.m. GMT) at 27.1°N 33.3°W – Tropical Storm Katia weakens to a tropical depression.
- 06:00 UTC (6:00 a.m. GMT) at 27.4°N 33.6°W – Tropical Depression Katia degenerates to a remnant low and subsequently dissipates.
- 15:00 UTC (11:00 a.m. AST) at 39.4°N 58.0°W – Tropical Storm Gert degenerates into a remnant low and later dissipates.

September 5

- 12:00 UTC (8:00 a.m. AST) at 12.2°N 39.6°W – Tropical Depression Thirteen forms from a tropical wave about midway between the coast of west Africa and the Windward Islands.
- 18:00 UTC (2:00 p.m. AST) at 12.9°N 41.1°W – Tropical Depression Thirteen strengthens into Tropical Storm Lee.

September 6

- 18:00 UTC (2:00 p.m. AST) at 14.6°N 46.1°W – Tropical Storm Lee strengthens into a Category 1 hurricane.

September 7

- 12:00 UTC (8:00 a.m. AST) at 16.1°N 49.2°W – Hurricane Lee intensifies to Category 2 strength.
- 12:00 UTC (11:00 a.m. CVT) at 15.5°N 26.0°W – Tropical Depression Fourteen forms from a tropical wave near Cabo Verde.
- 18:00 UTC (2:00 p.m. AST) at 16.6°N 50.7°W – Hurricane Lee intensifies to Category 3 strength.
- 18:00 UTC (5:00 p.m. CVT) at 16.0°N 27.3°W – Tropical Depression Fourteen strengthens into Tropical Storm Margot.

September 8

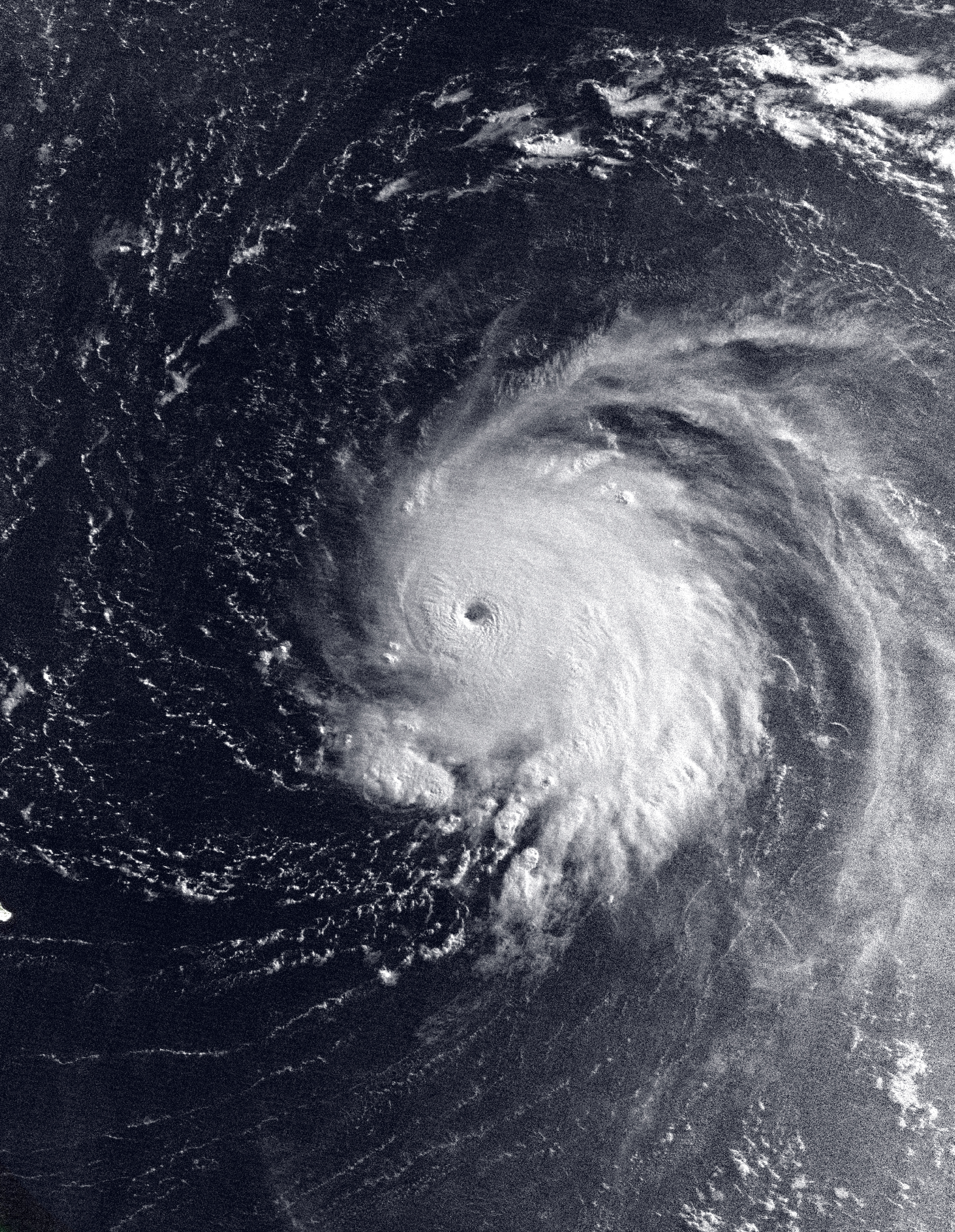
Hurricane Lee at peak intensity on September 8

- 00:00 UTC (8:00 p.m. AST, September 7) at 17.0°N 51.8°W – Hurricane Lee intensifies to Category 4 strength.
- 06:00 UTC (2:00 a.m. AST) at 17.5°N 53.0°W – Hurricane Lee intensifies to Category 5 strength, and simultaneously reaches peak intensity with maximum sustained winds of 165 mph (270 km/h) and a minimum central pressure of 926 mbar (27.34 inHg), several hundred miles east of the Leeward Islands.
- 12:00 UTC (8:00 a.m. AST) at 17.9°N 54.1°W – Hurricane Lee weakens to Category 4 strength.

September 9

- 00:00 UTC (8:00 p.m. AST, September 8) at 19.0°N 56.0°W – Hurricane Lee weakens to Category 3 strength.
- 18:00 UTC (2:00 p.m. AST) at 20.4°N 58.8°W – Hurricane Lee weakens to Category 2 strength.

September 10

- 18:00 UTC (2:00 p.m. AST) at 21.9°N 61.4°W – Hurricane Lee re-intensifies to Category 3 strength north of the Leeward Islands.

September 11

- 12:00 UTC (8:00 a.m. AST) at 23.2°N 63.2°W – Hurricane Lee reaches a secondary peak with maximum sustained winds of 120 mph (195 km/h) and a minimum central pressure of 948 mbar (27.99 inHg).
- 18:00 UTC (6:00 p.m. GMT) at 26.4°N 39.9°W – Tropical Storm Margot strengthens into a Category 1 hurricane.

September 12

- 06:00 UTC (6:00 a.m. GMT) at 33.0°N 39.9°W – Hurricane Margot reaches peak intensity with maximum sustained winds of 90 mph (150 km/h) and a minimum central pressure of 969 mbar (28.61 inHg).

September 13

- 12:00 UTC (8:00 a.m. AST) at 26.0°N 67.2°W – Hurricane Lee weakens to Category 2 strength about 460 mi (740 km) south-southwest of Bermuda.

September 14

- 12:00 UTC (8:00 a.m. AST) at 29.8°N 68.2°W – Hurricane Lee weakens to Category 1 strength about 265 mi (425 km) southwest of Bermuda.

September 15

- 06:00 UTC (6:00 a.m. GMT) at 36.7°N 38.6°W – Hurricane Margot weakens to a tropical storm.
- 06:00 UTC (2:00 a.m. AST) at 13.6°N 42.2°W – Tropical Depression Fifteen forms from a tropical wave over the tropical Atlantic.

September 16

- 06:00 UTC (2:00 a.m. AST) at 40.9°N 66.0°W – Hurricane Lee transitions to an extratropical cyclone roughly 285 mi (460 km) south-southwest of Halifax, Nova Scotia. (Note: At 20:00 UTC (4:00 p.m. AST) on September 16, Extratropical Cyclone Lee made landfall with sustained winds of 65 mph (100 km/h) on Long Island in southwestern Nova Scotia. It then moved across New Brunswick, Prince Edward Island, and Newfoundland, before dissipating late on September 18.)

September 17

- 00:00 UTC (12:00 a.m. GMT) at 34.0°N 40.1°W – Tropical Storm Margot degenerates into a remnant low and subsequently dissipates.
- 00:00 UTC (8:00 p.m. AST, September 16) at 21.4°N 47.6°W – Tropical Depression Fifteen strengthens into Tropical Storm Nigel.

September 18

- 06:00 UTC (2:00 a.m. AST) at 26.0°N 50.6°W – Tropical Storm Nigel strengthens into a Category 1 hurricane.

September 19

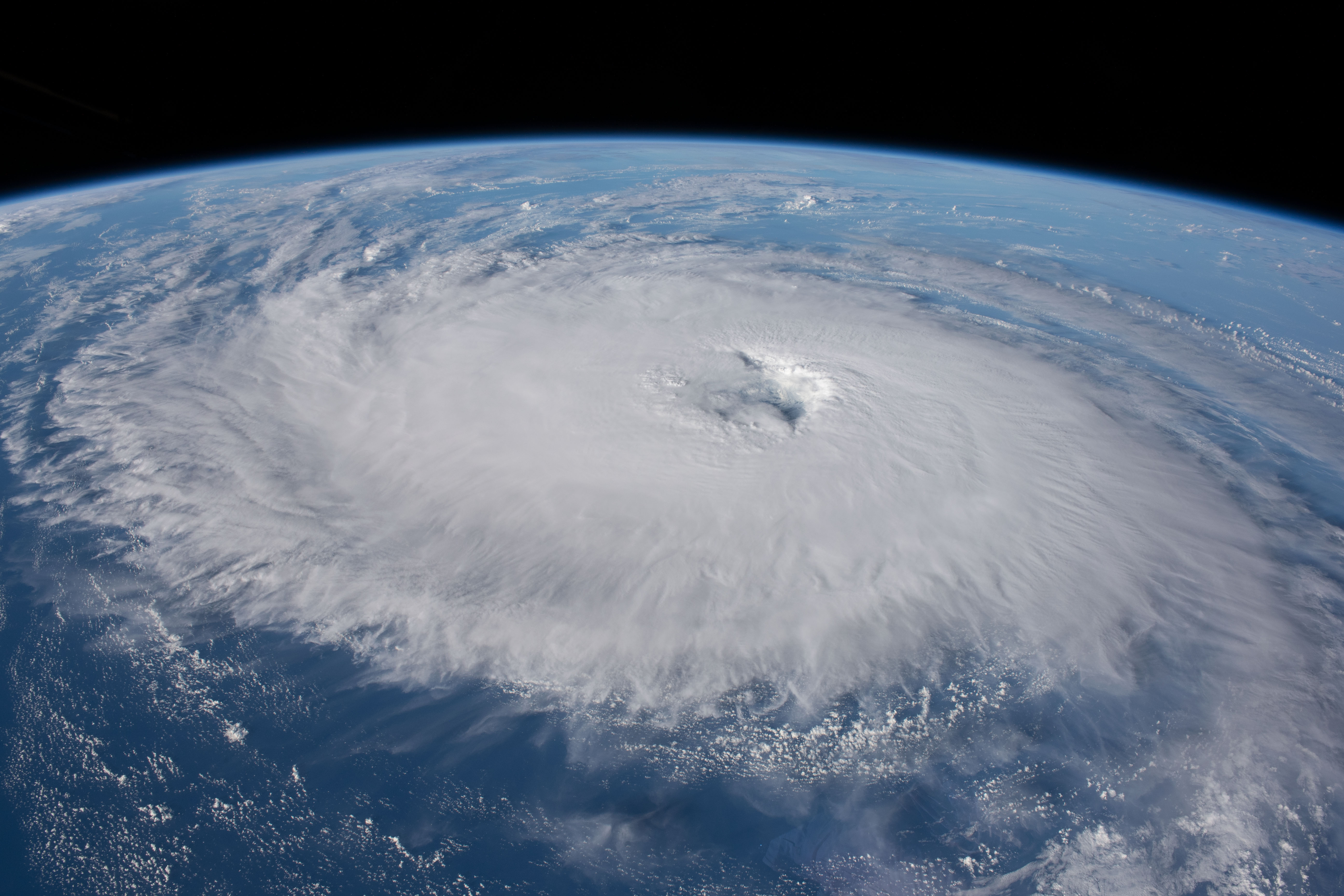
Hurricane Nigel nearing Category 2 strength, as viewed from the International Space Station on September 19

- 18:00 UTC (2:00 p.m. AST) at 31.1°N 54.7°W – Hurricane Nigel intensifies to Category 2 strength.

September 20

- 00:00 UTC (8:00 p.m. AST, September 19) at 32.4°N 55.0°W – Hurricane Nigel reaches peak intensity with maximum sustained winds of 100 mph (155 km/h) and a minimum central pressure of 971 mbar (28.67 inHg) over the Central Atlantic.
- 12:00 UTC (8:00 a.m. AST) at 35.2°N 54.7°W – Hurricane Nigel weakens to Category 1 strength.

September 22

- 06:00 UTC (6:00 a.m. GMT) at 45.4°N 34.4°W – Hurricane Nigel transitions to an extratropical cyclone, and subsequently dissipates.
- 18:00 UTC (2:00 p.m. EDT) at 32.7°N 76.1°W – Tropical Storm Ophelia forms from a non-tropical area of low pressure about 150 mi (240 km) southeast of Cape Fear, North Carolina. (Note: Due to the threat the developing system posed to the southeastern U.S. coast, the National Hurricane Center initiated advisories on it, designating it Potential Tropical Cyclone Sixteen at 15:00 UTC (11:00 a.m. EDT) on September 21.)

September 23

- 06:00 UTC (2:00 a.m. EDT) at 33.8°N 77.1°W – Tropical Storm Ophelia reaches peak intensity with maximum sustained winds of 70 mph (110 km/h) and a minimum central pressure of 981 mbar (28.97 inHg), about 55 mi (90 km) southwest of Cape Lookout, North Carolina.
- 06:00 UTC (2:00 a.m. AST) at 15.5°N 36.6°W – Tropical Depression Seventeen forms about 1,555 mi (2,500 km) east of Barbados.
- 10:15 UTC (6:15 a.m. EDT) at 34.7°N 77.1°W – Tropical Storm Ophelia makes landfall near Emerald Isle, North Carolina with sustained winds of 70 mph (110 km/h).
- 18:00 UTC (2:00 p.m. AST) at 15.7°N 39.1°W – Tropical Depression Seventeen strengthens into Tropical Storm Philippe about 1,385 mi (2,230 km) east of Barbados.

September 24

- 00:00 UTC (8:00 p.m. EDT, September 23) at 36.8°N 77.6°W – Tropical Storm Ophelia degenerates to a remnant low south-southwest of Richmond, Virginia.

September 25

- 06:00 UTC (2:00 a.m. AST) at 17.1°N 43.8°W – Tropical Storm Philippe reaches peak intensity with maximum sustained winds of 60 mph (95 km/h) and a minimum central pressure of 998 mbar (29.47 inHg) about 1,150 mi (1,850 km) east of Barbuda.

September 28

- 06:00 UTC (2:00 a.m. AST) at 15.6°N 44.5°W – Tropical Storm Rina forms east of the northern Leeward Islands.

September 29

Infrared satellite loop of tropical storms Philippe (left) and Rina (right) early on September 29

- 06:00 UTC (2:00 a.m. AST) at 18.6°N 46.4°W – Tropical Storm Rina reaches peak intensity with maximum sustained winds of 50 mph (85 km/h) and a minimum central pressure of 999 mbar (29.50 inHg) east of the Northern Leeward Islands.

=== October ===
October 1

- 18:00 UTC (2:00 p.m. AST) at 25.8°N 55.3°W – Tropical Storm Rina degenerates into a remnant low northeast of the northern Leeward Islands.

October 2

- 22:45 UTC (6:45 p.m. AST) at 17.6°N 61.8°W – Tropical Storm Philippe makes landfall on Barbuda with sustained winds of 50 mph (85 km/h).

October 6

- 06:00 UTC (02:00 a.m. AST) at 28.7°N 65.5°W – Tropical Storm Philippe is absorbed by an extratropical low about 175 mi (280 km) south of Bermuda.

October 10

- 18:00 UTC (2:00 p.m. AST) at 9.6°N 30.2°W – Tropical Depression Nineteen forms from a low-latitude tropical wave far southwest of Cabo Verde.

October 11

- 00:00 UTC (8:00 p.m. AST, October 10) at 9.8°N 31.4°W – Tropical Depression Nineteen strengthens into Tropical Storm Sean.
- 18:00 UTC (2:00 p.m. AST) at 11.3°N 34.7°W – Tropical Storm Sean weakens to a tropical depression.

October 12

- 12:00 UTC (8:00 a.m. AST) at 12.8°N 37.1°W – Tropical Depression Sean re-strengthens to a tropical storm.
- 18:00 UTC (2:00 p.m. AST) at 13.3°N 37.8°W – Tropical Storm Sean reaches peak intensity with maximum sustained winds of 45 mph (75 km/h) and a minimum central pressure of 1005 mbar (29.68 inHg).

October 14

- 06:00 UTC (2:00 a.m. AST) at 15.3°N 43.3°W – Tropical Storm Sean weakens to a tropical depression.

October 15

- 12:00 UTC (8:00 a.m. AST) at 17.6°N 46.6°W – Tropical Depression Sean degenerates into a remnant low far east of the northern Leeward Islands, and subsequently dissipates.

October 18

- 18:00 UTC (2:00 p.m. AST) at 12.9°N 51.0°W – Tropical Storm Tammy forms from a well-defined tropical wave about 575 mi (925 km) east of the Lesser Antilles.

October 20

- 18:00 UTC (2:00 p.m. AST) at 14.1°N 58.9°W – Tropical Storm Tammy strengthens into a Category 1 hurricane about 115 mi (185 km) east of the Lesser Antilles.

October 22

- 01:15 UTC (9:15 p.m. AST October 21) at 17.6°N 61.8°W – Hurricane Tammy makes landfall with sustained winds of 90 mph (150 km/h) on Barbuda.

October 23

- 21:00 UTC (5:00 p.m. EDT) at 11.6°N 83.5°W – Tropical Depression Twenty-One forms from an area of disturbed weather along the eastern portion of the eastern Pacific monsoon trough about 80 mi (130 km) east of the coast of southern Nicaragua.

October 24

- 01:30 UTC (9:30 p.m. EDT, October 23) at 12.4°N 83.5°W – Tropical Depression Twenty-One makes landfall about 35 mi (55 km) north-northeast of Bluefields, Nicaragua.
- 12:00 UTC (8:00 a.m. EDT) at 13.5°N 84.4°W – Tropical Depression Twenty-One degenerates into a remnant low inland, and later dissipates. (Note: The remnants of the depression crossed over Central America and contributed to the formation of Tropical Storm Pilar in the Eastern Pacific.)

October 25

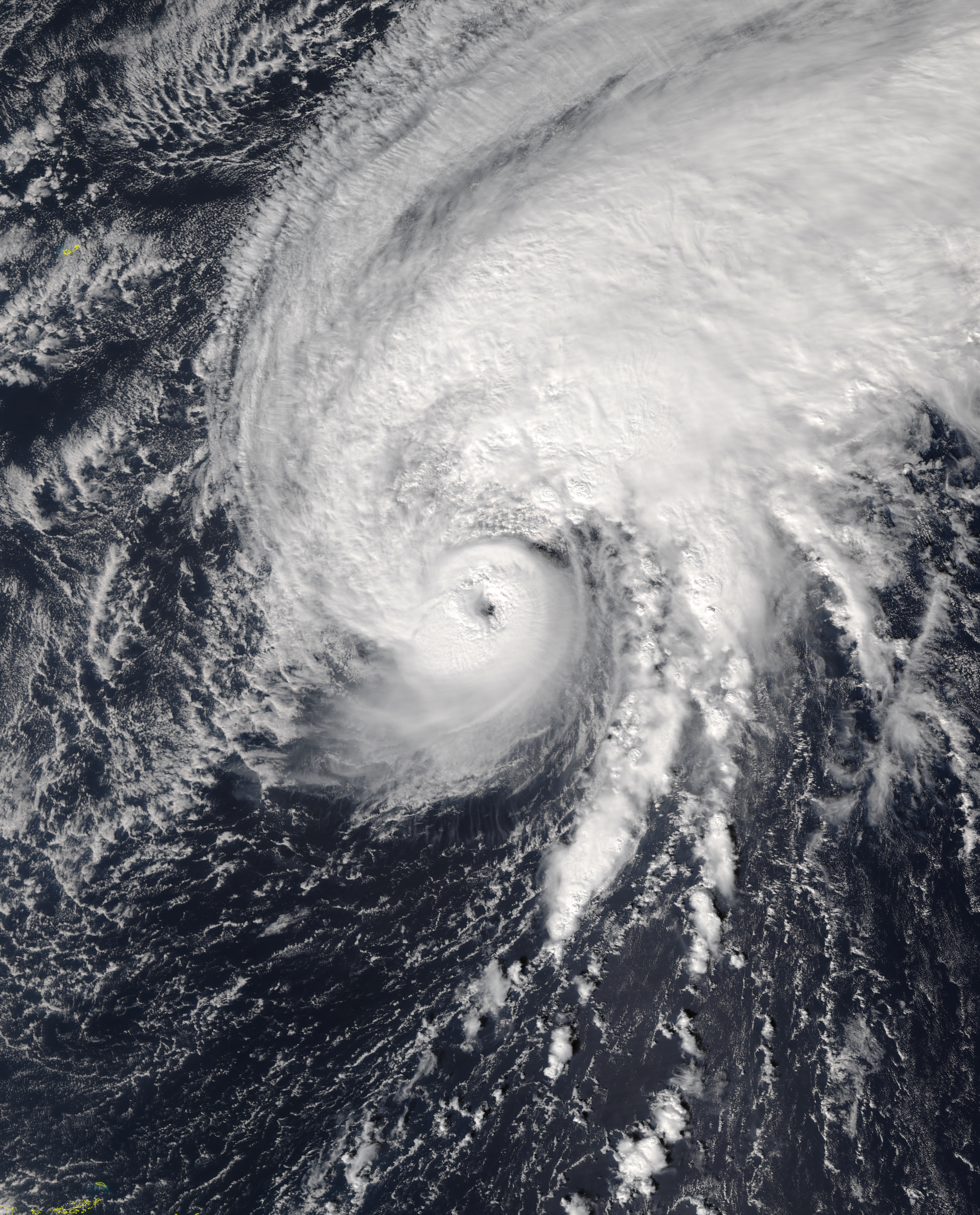
Hurricane Tammy at near-peak intensity on October 25

- 06:00 UTC (2:00 a.m. AST) at 25.1°N 60.4°W – Hurricane Tammy intensifies to Category 2 strength.
- 12:00 UTC (8:00 a.m. AST) at 26.1°N 59.4°W – Hurricane Tammy reaches peak intensity with maximum sustained winds of 110 mph (175 km/h) and a minimum central pressure of 965 mbar (28.50 inHg).

October 26

- 00:00 UTC (8:00 p.m. AST, October 25) at 29.9°N 57.8°W – Hurricane Tammy weakens to Category 1 strength.

October 27

- 00:00 UTC (8:00 p.m. AST, October 26) at 31.5°N 60.1°W – Hurricane Tammy weakens to a tropical storm.

October 29

- 00:00 UTC (8:00 p.m. AST, October 28) at 32.8°N 56.1°W – Tropical Storm Tammy degenerates into a remnant low, and subsequently dissipates over the central Atlantic.

=== November ===
- No tropical cyclones form in the basin during the month of November. (Note: At 21:00 UTC on November 16 (4:00 p.m. EST), the National Hurricane Center initiated advisories on a disturbance over the southwestern Caribbean Sea due to the threat it posed to Jamaica, eastern Cuba, Haiti, southeastern Bahamas, and Turks and Caicos Islands, designating it Potential Tropical Cyclone Twenty-Two. The last advisory on the system was issued at 03:00 UTC on November 18 (10:00 p.m. EST, November 17), after it became evident that the disturbance would not become a tropical cyclone or bring sustained tropical-storm-force winds to land areas along its projected path.)

November 30

- The Atlantic hurricane season officially ends.

== See also ==
- Timeline of the 2023 Pacific hurricane season
- Tropical cyclones in 2023
- Lists of Atlantic hurricanes
