= Hurricane Lee (2023) =

Category 5 Atlantic hurricane

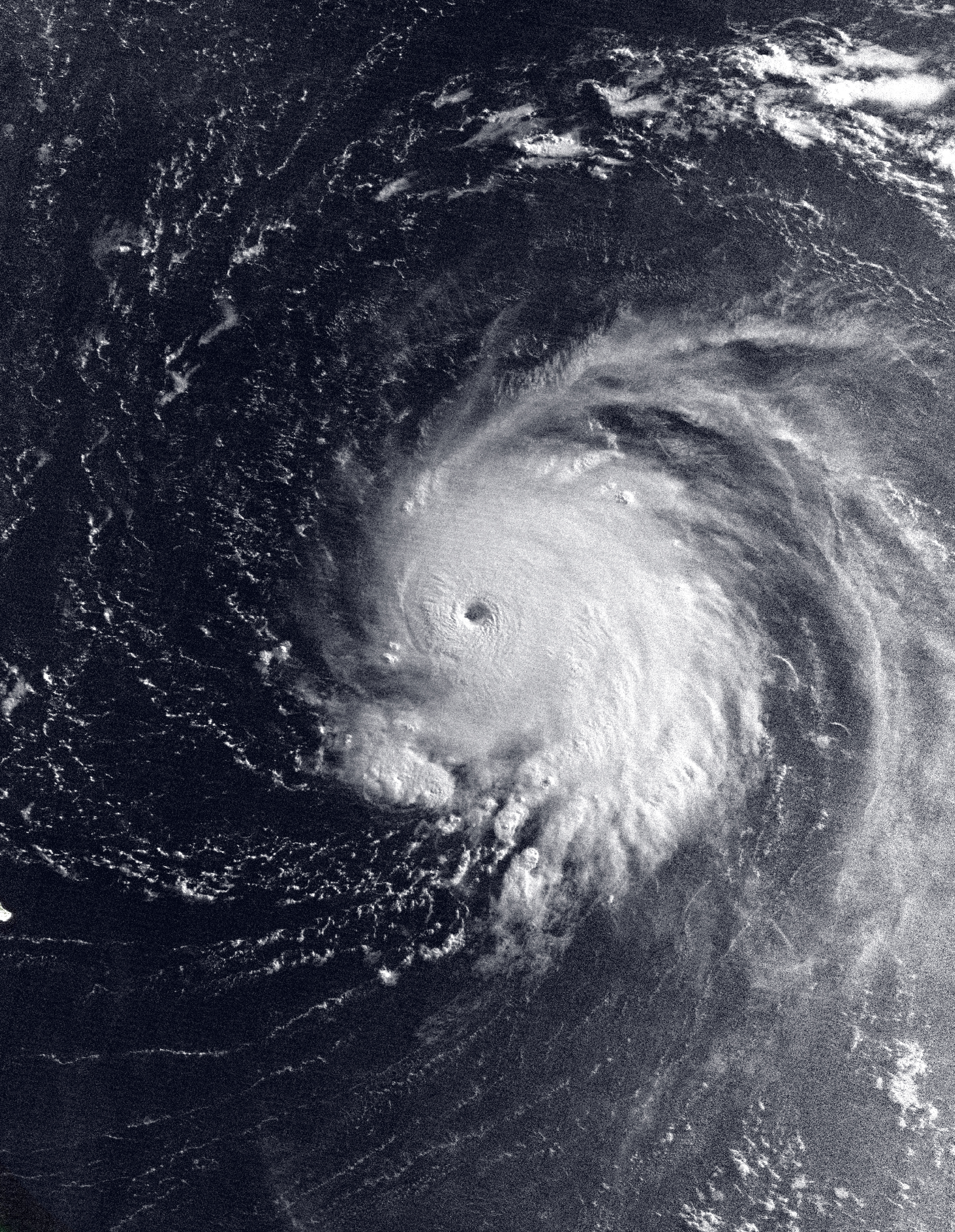
- Lee at peak intensity east of the Leeward Islands on September 8

Meteorological history
- Formed: September 5, 2023
- Extratropical: September 16, 2023
- Dissipated: September 18, 2023

Category 5 major hurricane
- 1-minute sustained (SSHWS/NWS)
- Highest winds: 165 mph (270 km/h)
- Lowest pressure: 926 mbar (hPa); 27.34 inHg

Overall effects
- Fatalities: 4 direct
- Damage: $80 million (2023 USD)
- Areas affected: Bermuda, Northeastern United States, Eastern Canada
- Part of the 2023 Atlantic hurricane season

Hurricane Lee was a long-lived and intense tropical cyclone that impacted Bermuda, the Northeastern United States, and Eastern Canada in September 2023. Lee formed on September 5 from a tropical wave that had moved offshore from West Africa into the tropical Atlantic a few days earlier. A strong steering current caused the storm to track northwestward, far from the northern Leeward Islands. Highly favorable conditions enabled Lee to rapidly intensify to a Category 5 hurricane on September 7; its winds increased by 80 mph (130 km/h) in 24 hours. This makes it the sixth‑fastest rapid intensification on record in the Atlantic, only behind Hurricane Wilma in 2005, Hurricane Felix in 2007, Hurricane Erin in 2025, Hurricane Milton in 2024, and Hurricane Matthew in 2016. Just as quickly however, Lee's strength waned, and it fluctuated in intensity for several days on account of strong wind shear and multiple eyewall replacement cycles.

On September 13, the system rounded the southwest side of a large ridge of high pressure over the central Atlantic, turned, and accelerated northward. Lee soon entered into an environment of increasing wind shear and moved into increasingly cooler water, causing the system to slowly weaken as it passed near Bermuda and New England. As a result, Lee transitioned into an extratropical cyclone on September 16. The cyclone then made landfalls in Nova Scotia, New Brunswick, Prince Edward Island, and in Newfoundland and Labrador, before moving out into the far northern Atlantic on September 18, where it merged with another extratropical low.

Rip currents caused one fatality in Puerto Rico when a 66-year-old man drowned at Poza del Obispo. Additionally, Lee generated dangerous surf and rip currents along the entire Atlantic coast of the United States. Lee produced hurricane-force winds gusts, along with flooding rains, mostly in Maine and Atlantic Canada. Consequently, approximately 200,000 power outages occurred in the United States, mostly in Maine, and a similar number in the Canadian provinces of New Brunswick and Nova Scotia. Maine and Atlantic Canada also reported many downed trees and power lines, as well as flash flooding, leading to road closures. Additionally, abnormally high tides and storm surge destroyed some roadways and a boardwalk in the Halifax area of Nova Scotia. Three storm-related fatalities occurred in the mainland of the United States: a 15-year-old boy drowned in Fernandina Beach, Florida; a 50-year-old man died in Searsport, Maine, when a tree fell onto the car he was in; and a 21-year-old man who was killed in Manasquan Inlet, New Jersey when the boat he was in capsized and sunk due to a tall wave. Total damage from the storm is estimated at $80 million.

== Meteorological history ==
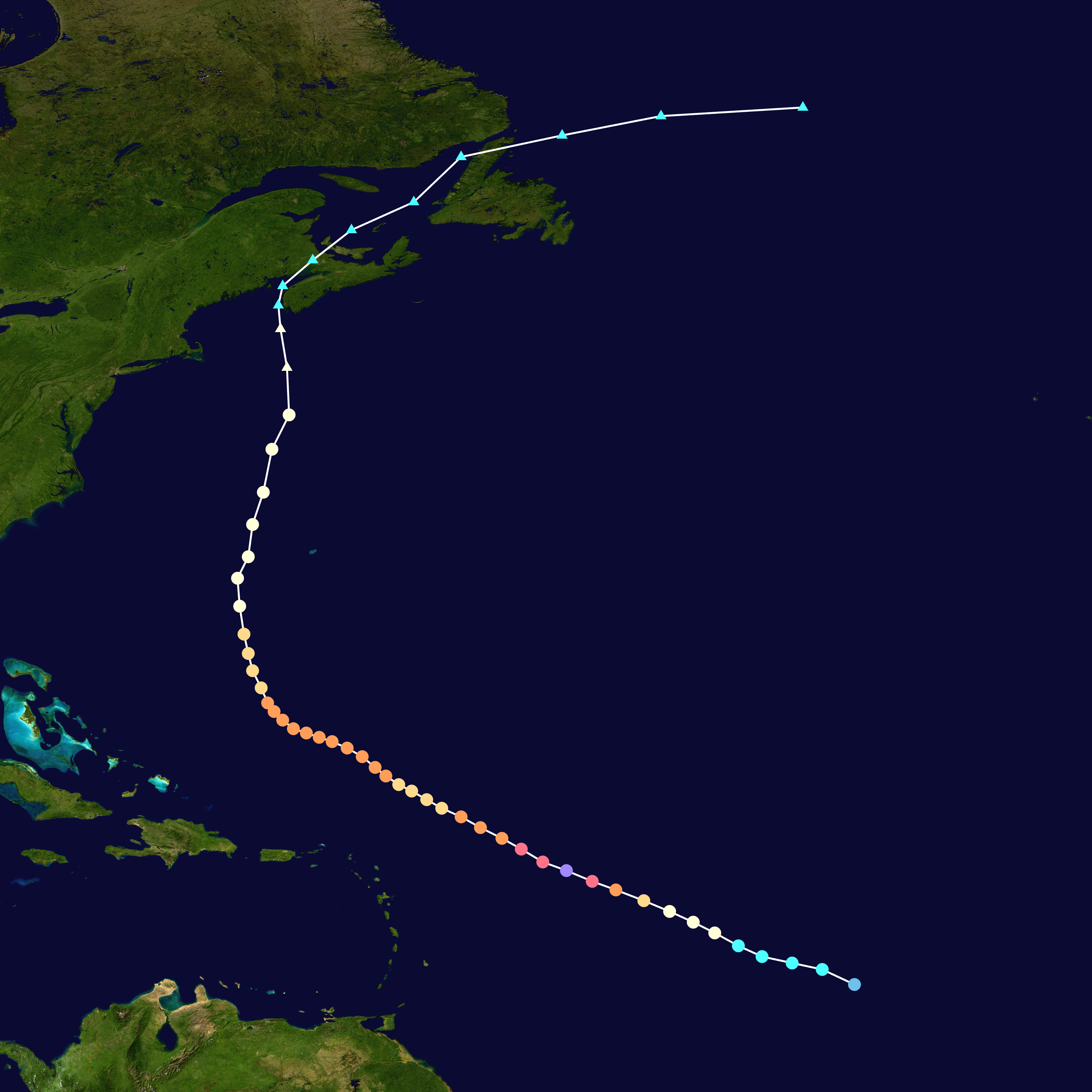
Map plotting the storm's track and intensity, according to the Saffir–Simpson scale Map key Saffir–Simpson scale Tropical depression (≤38 mph, ≤62 km/h) Tropical storm (39–73 mph, 63–118 km/h) Category 1 (74–95 mph, 119–153 km/h) Category 2 (96–110 mph, 154–177 km/h) Category 3 (111–129 mph, 178–208 km/h) Category 4 (130–156 mph, 209–251 km/h) Category 5 (≥157 mph, ≥252 km/h) Unknown Storm type Tropical cyclone Subtropical cyclone Extratropical cyclone, remnant low, tropical disturbance, or monsoon depression

On September 1, a tropical wave emerged into the tropical Atlantic from the west coast of Africa producing disorganized convection and began to gradually organize. A broad surface low formed by September 4, which acquired multiple low-level bands developing and a well-defined center on September 5. Consequently, Tropical Depression Thirteen developed at 12:00 UTC that day about halfway between the west coast of Africa and the Lesser Antilles.

Amid favorable conditions for intensification, the depression quickly strengthened into Tropical Storm Lee by 18:00 UTC on September 5 and then a hurricane by 21:00 UTC on September 6. Lee tracked west-northwestward, steered by a mid-level ridge located to its north. Lee continued to intensify as it became better organized, with increased convective banding, development of a central dense overcast, and formation of a ragged eye, evident in visible satellite imagery by the following afternoon. Explosive intensification began the next day, with Lee reaching Category 2 strength at 15:00 UTC on September 7 then reaching Category 4 strength at 21:00 UTC, as its eye cleared. A few hours later, a hurricane hunters mission into the storm found that it had reached Category 5 strength, and possessed a clear 17 mi-wide (28 km) eye surrounded by convective cloud tops with temperatures as low as −105 °F (−76 °C). By 06:00 UTC on September 8, Lee's maximum sustained winds reached 165 mph (270 km/h), an increase of 80 mph (130 km/h) in 24 hours, making it the sixth‑fastest intensifying Atlantic hurricane on record, surpassed by Matthew in 2016, Erin in 2025, Milton in 2024, Felix in 2007, and Wilma in 2005. During this same time period, the hurricane's minimum barometric pressure fell to 926 mbar (27.34 inHg). However, increasing southwesterly wind shear quickly caused Lee's eye to become cloud filled and the storm became more asymmetric, weakening it back to a high-end Category 4 hurricane. The pace of weakening quickened as the day progressed, and Lee fell below Category 3 status by late on September 9. Data from an evening hurricane hunters mission indicated that the storm was undergoing an eyewall replacement cycle.

By September 10, wind shear abated, and the eyewall replacement cycle was completed, permitting the new, larger-diameter eye to contract and to grow more symmetric. As a result, Lee intensified to a Category 3 major hurricane strength once again that same day. Another series of eyewall replacement cycles led to fluctuations in its size and intensity, but Lee remained a major hurricane throughout. After tracking west-northwestward to northwestward for much of its trans‑Atlantic journey, Lee turned northward on September 13, moving around the western side of the steering subtropical ridge. That same day, it also weakened to Category 2 strength. Then, on the morning of September 14, Lee became a Category 1 hurricane while approaching Bermuda, passing to the west by 185 mi (300 km) later in the day. As the hurricane pushed northward, dry air and wind shear displaced Lee's convection to the northern side of the system, weakening it further. These factors caused the hurricane to commence its extratropical transition, which was completed by 06:00 UTC on September 16. The cyclone then made landfalls in Nova Scotia, New Brunswick, Prince Edward Island, and in Newfoundland, before moving into the northern Atlantic and merging with another extratropical low late on September 18.

== Preparations ==
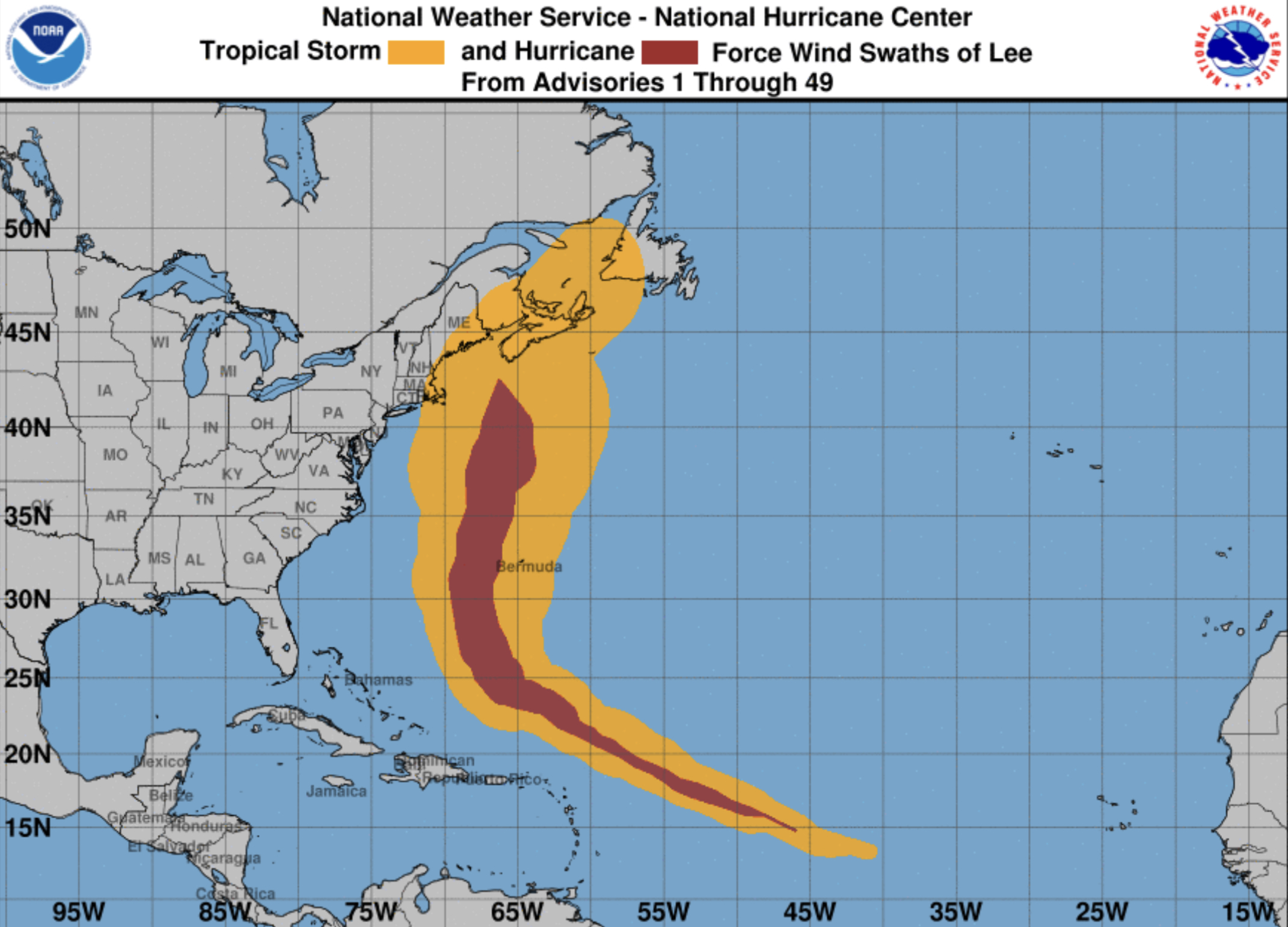
Hurricane Lee's wind field history

=== Bermuda ===
Bermuda received tropical storm watches on September 12, which were later upgraded to warnings on September 13. The House of Assembly moved their September 15 meeting date to September 22.

=== United States ===
A hurricane watch and a tropical storm watch were issued for the New England coastline from Rhode Island to Maine, including Block Island, Martha's Vineyard and Nantucket, on September 13. A storm surge watch was also issued for Cape Cod Bay and Nantucket, although this alert was cancelled when the storm veered further to the east.

A wind advisory was put into effect for New Hampshire's White Mountains, where wind would be stronger due to elevation.

New York State Governor Kathy Hochul deployed fifty National Guard members to Long Island in preparation of the storm's possible arrival. On September 15, the town of Southampton declared a state of emergency, shutting down coastal roads. The same day, the town of East Hampton prohibited swimming at all beaches.

In Massachusetts, boats on Nantucket were pulled from the water or were sheltered in protected harbors. All Hy-Line Cruises service was canceled between Martha's Vineyard and Hyannis, and from Martha's Vineyard to Nantucket. The Steamship Authority waived change and cancellation fees for ferries between September 15 and 17. On September 14, Boston opened an emergency operations center. The Boston Police and Fire Departments were put on standby. On September 15, Massachusetts Governor Maura Healey announced a state of emergency in response to the cyclone. Healey also announced that 50 members of the Massachusetts National Guard capable of operating high-water vehicles were being activated in anticipation of any potential rescues.

The Rhode Island Department of Transportation cleaned out storm drains and cut down at risk trees to mitigate flood and wind risk. The Independent Man statue atop the Rhode Island State House in Providence was being taken down for repairs before any potential impacts by Lee could put it at risk.

Maine Governor Janet Mills declared a state of emergency and requested President Joe Biden to issue an emergency disaster declaration for the state, and he did so later that evening. Utility workers from as far as Tennessee were brought into the state to help quickly restore power in case of outages. Boat owners were advised to secure their boats by the Maine Harbor Master's Association. The White Mountains in Maine were also put under wind advisory. On September 16, about half of all flights to and from Portland International Jetport were canceled, while most flights were canceled to and from Bangor International Airport due to high winds. The National Park Service also shut down certain areas of Acadia National Park.

=== Canada ===
Environment Canada issued hurricane watches for parts of Charlotte County, particularly its coast and Grand Manan Island in New Brunswick, as well as Nova Scotia's Digby, Yarmouth, Shelburne, and Queens counties. Further tropical storm watches were issued for southeastern New Brunswick as well as several parts of Nova Scotia. On September 15, Prime Minister Justin Trudeau announced that he had convened the Incident Response Group to discuss potential impacts from the cyclone and warned Canadians to take precautions and listen to their local officials.

Cancellations were made for cruise ships scheduled to stop at the Port of Saint John. On September 15, New Brunswick Emergency Measures Organization director Kyle Leavitt warned of hazardous driving conditions and urged residents to stay home. NB Power vice-president Nicole Poirier also announced that crews were put into position to respond to potential power outages. Many flights were canceled or delayed to and from Greater Moncton Roméo LeBlanc International Airport and Fredericton International Airport due to hazardous conditions on September 16 and 17. A senior director for energy delivery for Nova Scotia Power, Matt Drover, announced that utility crews were being mobilized throughout the province. Bay Ferries also canceled sailings of the MV Fundy Rose between September 16 and 17. Most flights to and from Halifax Stanfield International Airport were canceled.

Northumberland Ferries Limited canceled ferry crossings between Nova Scotia and Prince Edward Island on Saturday. Maritime Electric stationed utility crews throughout the province to respond to any potential power outages. Flights were also cancelled to and from Charlottetown Airport.

=== Elsewhere ===
A tropical cyclone alert was in effect for the Leeward Islands and the British Virgin Islands on September 7–8. Additionally, a 5‑day high surf warning was issued for the British Virgin Islands on September 8.

On September 7, the United States federal government deployed food, water, and rapid response teams to Puerto Rico and the United States Virgin Islands.

== Impact ==
=== Bermuda ===
Bermuda experienced tropical storm conditions. L.F. Wade International Airport reported peak winds of 51 mph (82 km/h) and was closed until September 16. 11,342 people lost power as a result of the storm. The Devonshire and St. George's bus depots had significant power failures, causing them to be closed until September 16. The Royal Naval Dockyard also suffered damage, causing ferry delays between the Dockyard and St. George's.

=== United States ===
During the afternoon on September 14, a boat was capsized during a small craft advisory after being hit by a tall wave in New Jersey's Manasquan Inlet, requiring first responders to rescue two people. A 21-year-old man who was also on the boat was killed and his body washed ashore on Point Pleasant Beach on September 24. Rough surf and dangerous rip currents were present along all of the east coast of the United States as Lee passed off the coast, and on September 15, a 15-year-old boy drowned due to rough surf off of Fernandina Beach, Florida. Total damage in the US is estimated at USD$50 million.

In New York, eastern Long Island experienced beach erosion and gusty winds from the storm.

In Massachusetts, numerous flights were canceled or delayed at Logan International Airport, with some routes being canceled entirely due to high winds. The majority of damage was caused by trees being felled due to a combination of gusty winds and highly saturated ground. In Cohasset, a Cohasset police officer's cruiser was crushed by a falling tree while the officer was outside his cruiser. Damage in the state totaled to $11,700.

On Mount Washington, gusts reached 96 mph (154 km/h).

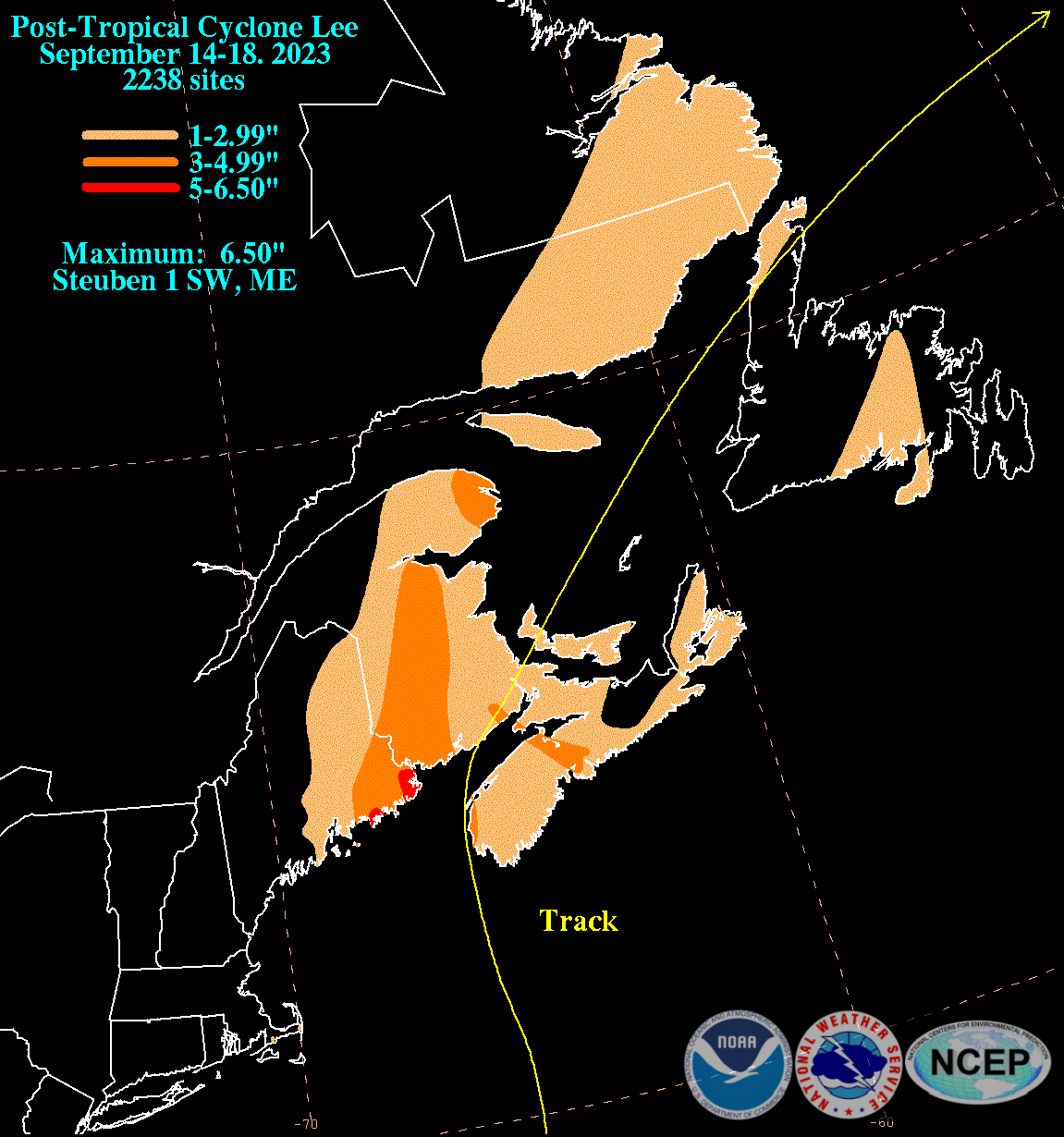
Rainfall map with post-tropical Lee.

On September 16, wind damage occurred across southeastern portions of Maine, where trees were down, including some that fell over a portion of SR 11 in Aroostook County, forcing a closure. Maine House Republican leader Billy Bob Faulkingham, along with another lobsterman, were rescued after their boat overturned off of Winter Harbor while they clung to the hull of the vessel until rescue arrived. A 50-year-old man was killed after his vehicle was struck by a falling tree in Searsport. A man was also injured while driving on SR 11 in Moro Plantation after a downed tree went through his windshield. In Bar Harbor, a whale watching vessel broke free and crashed ashore, forcing authorities to offload 1,800 U.S. gallons (6,800 L) of diesel fuel to prevent it from spilling into the ocean. On the afternoon of September 16, about 94,000 customers in Maine were without power. Heavy rain also fell throughout Maine, peaking at 6.50 in (165 mm) in Steuben.

=== Canada ===
Strong winds with hurricane‑force gusts caused widespread, but minimal damage in Nova Scotia and in New Brunswick as Lee passed through, mostly in the form of downed trees and power lines. Power outages associated with the cyclone rose to 37,000 in New Brunswick, on the afternoon of September 16. Total damages in Canada are estimated at $30 million.

In New Brunswick, trees were felled throughout the province, sometimes taking utility poles and wires with them. Low-lying areas in Saint John and Fredericton suffered from flooding.

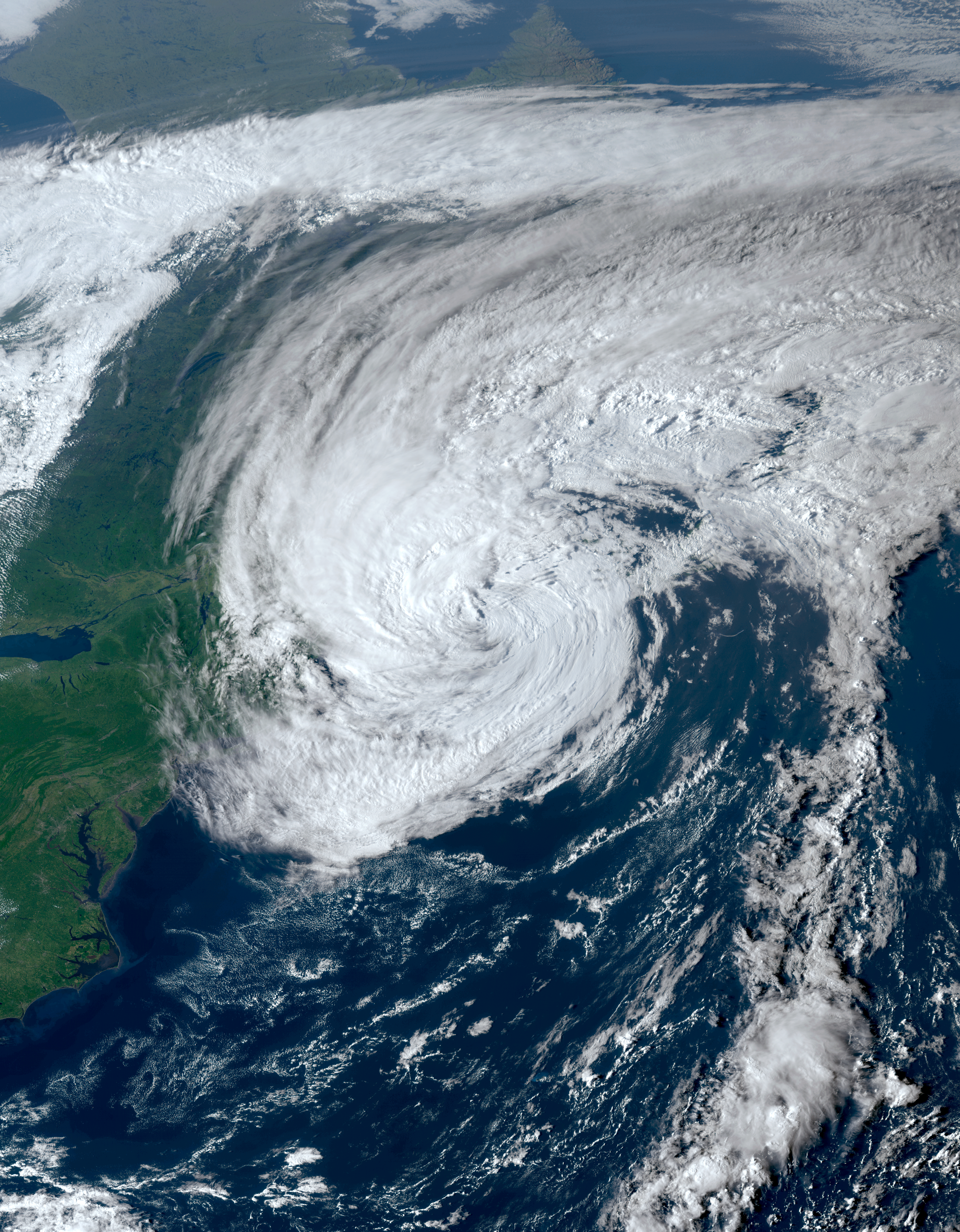
Lee as a post-tropical cyclone making landfall in Nova Scotia on September 16

In Nova Scotia, nearly 200,000 customers lost electricity. A utility pole caught fire in Stoney Island. Coastal roads were inundated by storm surge, with several roads in the Eastern Shore region being destroyed by storm surge. The majority of damage was caused by trees being knocked over by wind gusts. Rissers Beach Provincial Park suffered significant storm surge, with extensive damage to the boardwalk and several trees being knocked over throughout the park. The highest wind gust caused by the cyclone in Canada, 73 mph (117 km/h), was recorded at Halifax Stanfield International Airport.

== See also ==
- Weather of 2023
- Tropical cyclones in 2023
- Timeline of the 2023 Atlantic hurricane season
- List of Category 5 Atlantic hurricanes
- List of hurricanes in Canada
- Other storms of the same name
