= River Sens =

River on Basse-Terre in Guadeloupe

Coordinates: 15°59′03″N 61°43′08″W

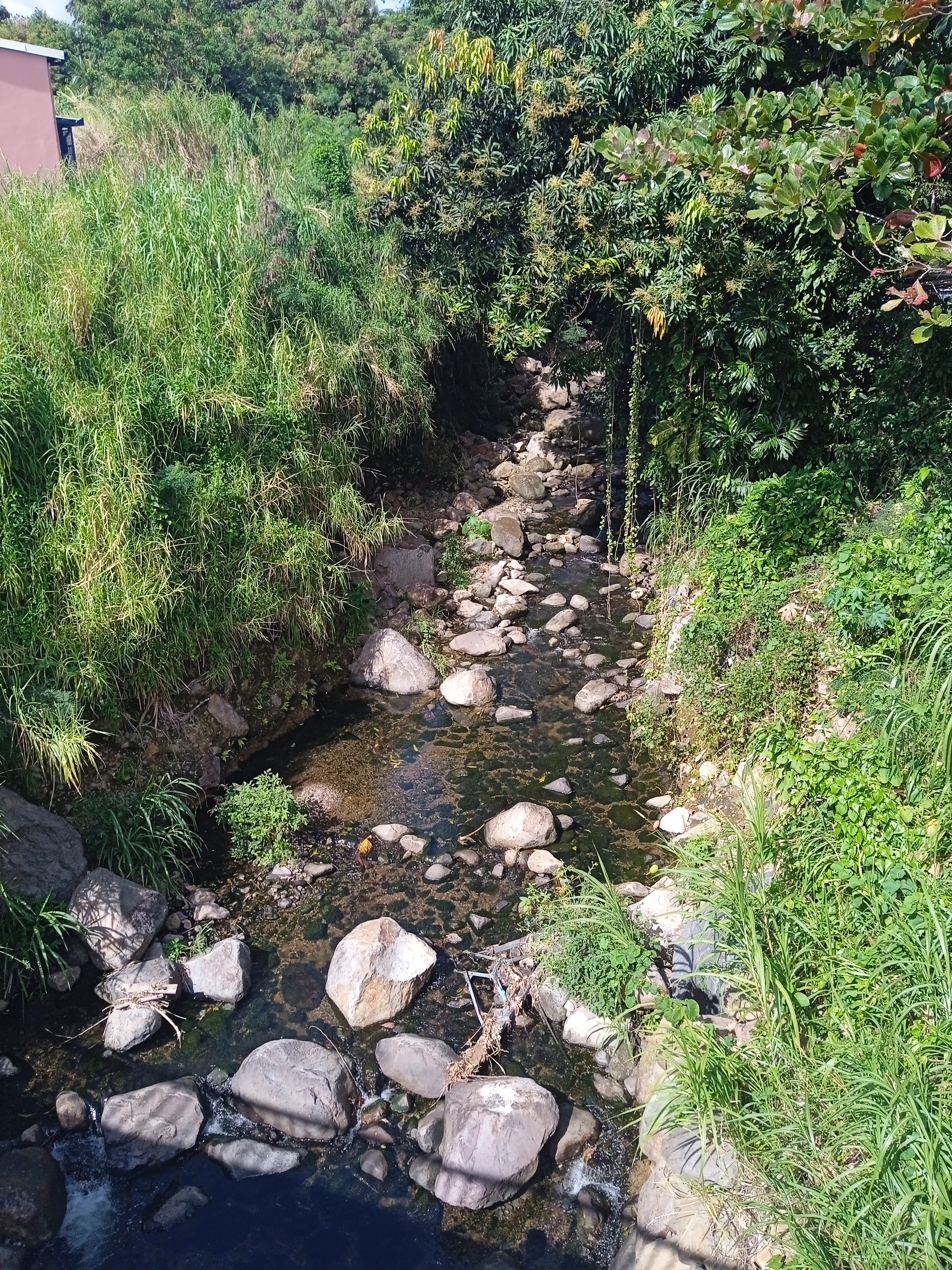
The River Sens viewed from a bridge

The River Sens is a river on Basse-Terre in Guadeloupe coming from the territory of Gourbeyre with its mouth emptying into the Caribbean.

== Geography ==
The river is 5.1 kilometres (3.2 mi). The River Sens's source is located 460 metres (500 yd) above sea level on the western flanks of plateau du Palmiste in the commune of Gourbeyre where it flows to the southwest.

Water from the Ravine Rouge and the Ravine Blanc flow into the Sens before it flows out to the Caribbean at the level of the River Sens Marina to the southeast of the center of Basse-Terre.

== History ==
In 2018, an experimental aquaculture project using the algae Arthrospira platensis to produce spirulina was carried out along with the development of an oyster farm in Gourbeyre in the mouth of the River Sens.

In 2023, Hurricane Tammy caused the river to rise up to its piers in Gourbeyre.
