= Tropical Storm Philippe (2023) =

Atlantic tropical storm

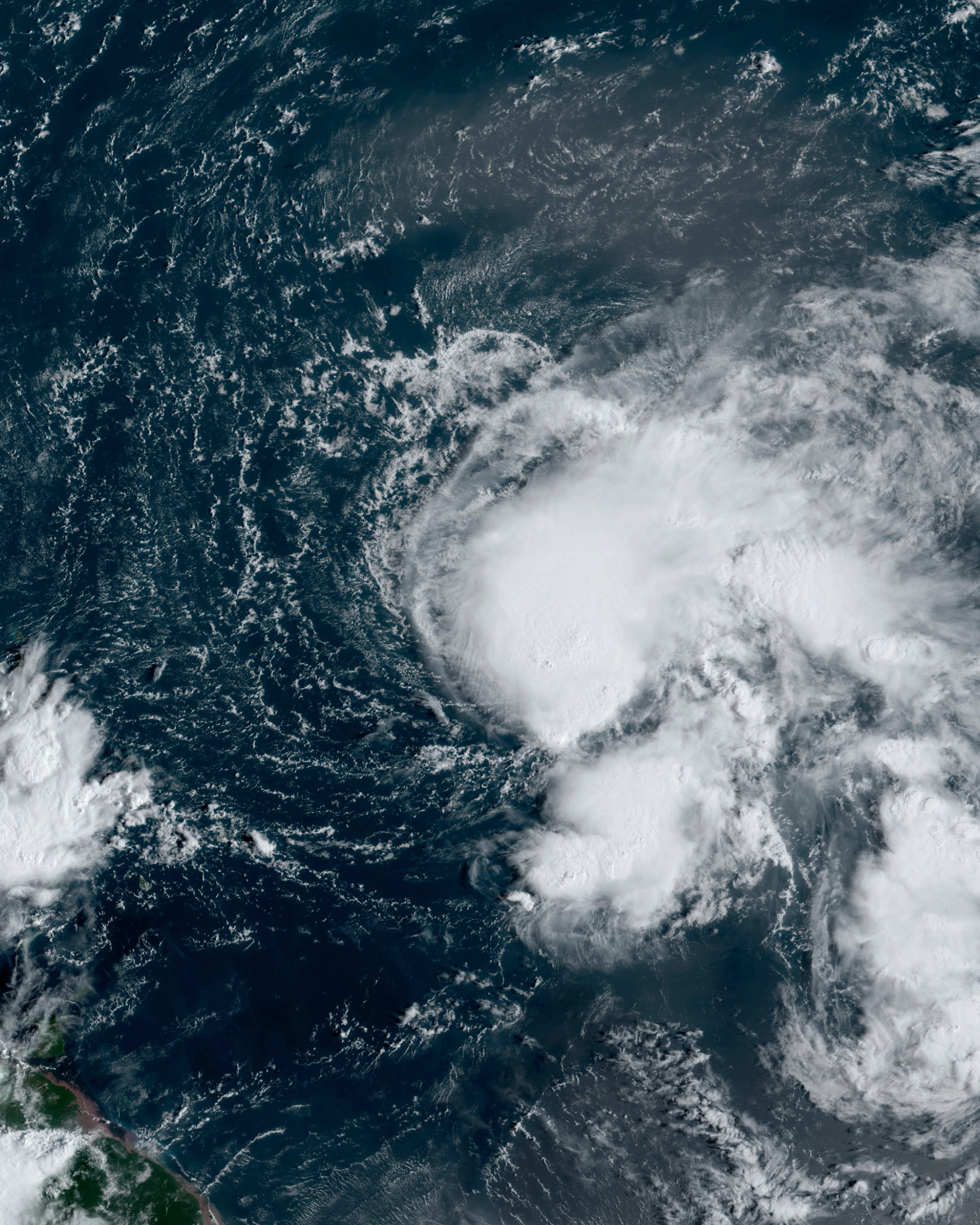
- Philippe shortly after peak intensity on September 27

Meteorological history
- Formed: September 23, 2023
- Dissipated: October 6, 2023

Tropical storm
- 1-minute sustained (SSHWS/NWS)
- Highest winds: 60 mph (95 km/h)
- Lowest pressure: 998 mbar (hPa); 29.47 inHg

Overall effects
- Fatalities: None
- Damage: $3.4 million (2023 USD)
- Areas affected: Northern Leeward Islands, Bermuda
- Part of the 2023 Atlantic hurricane season

Tropical Storm Philippe was a long-lived but poorly organized tropical cyclone which affected the eastern Caribbean during late September and early October 2023. The sixteenth named storm of the 2023 Atlantic hurricane season, (Note: This excludes a retroactively recognized and unnamed subtropical storm in January.) Philippe formed from a tropical wave on September 23, near Cabo Verde. The storm traversed the Leeward Islands, before being absorbed into an extratropical low on October 6, south of Bermuda.

Overall wind damage was minor; there were no storm related casualties. However, heavy rainfall along its trajectory led to significant flooding and multiple mudslides, especially across Guadeloupe, and Antigua and Barbuda. Bermuda had minor impacts from Philippe's strong winds and rain. Overall damage totaled to US$3.4 million (2023 USD).

== Meteorological history ==
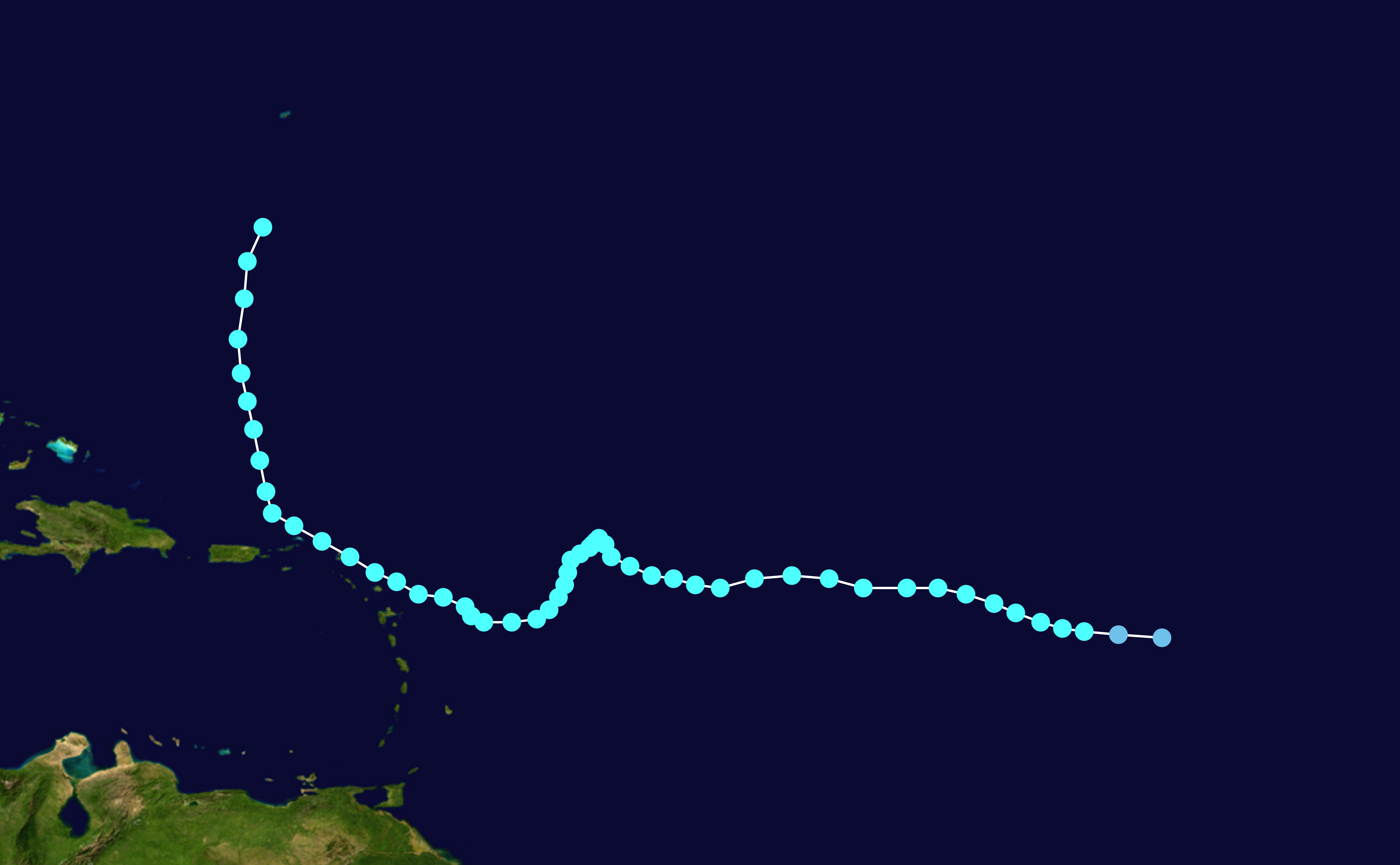
Map plotting the storm's track and intensity, according to the Saffir–Simpson scale Map key Saffir–Simpson scale Tropical depression (≤38 mph, ≤62 km/h) Tropical storm (39–73 mph, 63–118 km/h) Category 1 (74–95 mph, 119–153 km/h) Category 2 (96–110 mph, 154–177 km/h) Category 3 (111–129 mph, 178–208 km/h) Category 4 (130–156 mph, 209–251 km/h) Category 5 (≥157 mph, ≥252 km/h) Unknown Storm type Tropical cyclone Subtropical cyclone Extratropical cyclone, remnant low, tropical disturbance, or monsoon depression

On September 15, the National Hurricane Center (NHC) began monitoring a tropical wave located inland over West Africa, which moved offshore several days later. On September 20, the wave began interacting with a disturbance just to its west, giving rise to a broad area of low pressure the next day. The disturbance developed a well-defined center on the morning of September 23, west of Cabo Verde, and deep convection associated with it became sufficiently organized to support formation of Tropical Depression Seventeen.

Later that day, the system strengthened into Tropical Storm Philippe. The storm strengthened some on the morning of September 24, as it moved westward through warm waters, steered along the southern side of a mid-level ridge. Philippe struggled, however, to become better organized overall, due to persistent 25–30 mph (35–45 km/h) deep-layer west-southwesterly wind shear. As a result, its center became fully exposed and far removed to the west of the deep convection the following day.

Even so, there was a convective burst that formed near the center of circulation center late on September 26, which continued into the following day. A convective band also began developing on the eastern side of the circulation. Philippe's structure deteriorated somewhat on September 28, with satellite images showing an elongated circulation and multiple centers. As there was some deep convection on the east and southeast sides of what NHC determined was the main center, the system still met the requisite criteria of a tropical cyclone. The storm also stalled, generally drifting to the southwest due to its interaction with Tropical Storm Rina to its east. Philippe remained adrift the following morning, and sheared, with the low-level center pushed to near the western edge of the main area of deep convection.

Philippe continued moving erratically for the next few days, strong northwesterly wind shear precluded any significant strengthening from occurring during this time. On October 2, the storm turned toward the northwest, and made landfall on Barbuda that evening. Satellite imagery showed a sheared, asymmetrical storm. Early on October 6, a large extratropical low formed west of Philippe, resulting in the rapid degradation of Philippe's structure. Philippe was fully absorbed by the other low by 12:00 UTC that day, about 175 mi (280 km) south of Bermuda.

== Preparations, impact, and records ==
=== Lesser Antilles ===
Wettest tropical cyclones and their remnants in Guadeloupe Highest-known totals
Precipitation			Storm	Location	Ref.
Rank	mm	in	Storm	Location	Ref.
1	582	22.91	Luis 1995	Dent de l'est (Soufrière)	
2	534	21.02	Fiona 2022	Saint-Claude	
3	508	20.00	Marilyn 1995	Saint-Claude	
4	466	18.35	Lenny 1999	Gendarmerie	
5	416	16.38	Philippe 2023	Vieux-Fort	
6	389	15.31	Hugo 1989		
7	318	12.52	Hortense 1996	Maison du Volcan	
8	300	11.81	Jeanne 2004		
9	223.3	8.79	Cleo 1964	Deshaies	
10	200	7.87	Erika 2009		

Several LIAT-airline flights were cancelled, and government offices and schools were closed in Antigua and Barbuda, Guadeloupe, Saint Martin and Saint Barthélemy. In Guadeloupe, some areas were left without running water, and isolated one community. Two roads and schools were closed, and 2,500 power outages occurred. Rainfall in Vieux-Fort, Guadeloupe reached 16.4 in (416 mm), causing multiple landslides. Also on Guadeloupe, four people were carried away by floods in their vehicles but were safely rescued. The storm made landfall in Barbuda, where homes and vehicles, especially in Antigua, were inundated by floodwaters, and a shelter was opened. Antigua and Barbuda received 6–8 in (150–200 mm) of rain and blackouts. Off the U.S. Virgin Islands, 12 people were rescued after a ship started to submerge in rough seas. The CCRIF made payouts for Excess Rainfall totaling US$3.4 million after the storm. Antigua and Barbuda received US$2,880,424 (2023 USD), and the British Virgin Islands received US$552,297 (2023 USD).

=== Bermuda ===
Authorities in Bermuda closed schools as a precaution ahead of the storm, which brought strong winds and heavy rain to Bermuda. At L.F. Wade International Airport, 1.22 in (31 mm) fell; overall impacts on the island were minor.

=== Elsewhere ===
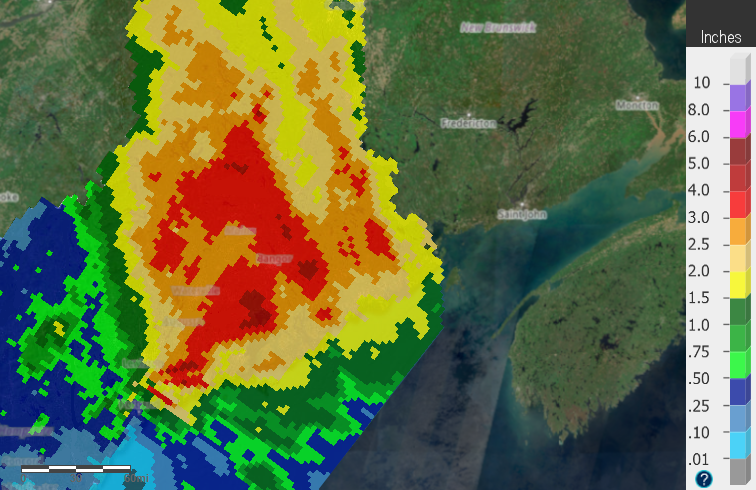
Rainfall radar map over Maine with ex-Philippe

On October 5, Environment Canada issued special weather statements for New Brunswick, Nova Scotia and Prince Edward Island regarding expected heavy rains in the region within 48 hours. Small craft advisories and gale warnings were issued by the National Weather Service for the Atlantic seaboard from Maine to southern North Carolina the following day, as were inland flash flood warnings. The extra-tropical low that absorbed Philippe's remnant circulation moved into Maine and the Canadian Maritimes on the afternoon of October 7. The next day, it merged with another extratropical system moving eastward from central Quebec.

In central Maine, 2–4 in (51–102 mm) of rain fell. Higher amounts were reported along the coast with a maximum of 5.95 in (151 mm) at North Haven in Knox County. Gusts in the state were in the 50–60 mph (80–97 km/h) range. Flooding related damage was reported around Prospect and Ellsworth. At one point, Maine's power companies also reported more than 17,000 customers without power.

Strong winds lashed Nova Scotia and New Brunswick from late on October 7 into the next day. 40 to 80 mm (1.57 to 3.15 in) of rain fell in southwestern Nova Scotia and 30 to 60 mm (1.18 to 2.36 in) in western New Brunswick. On the morning of October 8, Nova Scotia Power reported that 1,400 customers were without power, and New Brunswick Power reported that 900 of their customers were also without power. Restrictions limited crossings on the Confederation Bridge between New Brunswick and Prince Edward Island while gusts of more than 56 mph (90 km/h) were reported. Morning ferry services between New Brunswick, Nova Scotia, Prince Edward Island and Maine also were canceled.

=== Records ===
With a lifespan of 13 days, Philippe became the longest-lived tropical cyclone in the Atlantic basin to never have attained hurricane status in the satellite era.

== See also ==
- Weather of 2023
- Tropical cyclones in 2023
- Other storms of the same name
- Timeline of the 2023 Atlantic hurricane season
- Hurricane Klaus (1990) – a slow-moving hurricane that caused flooding on Saint Lucia and Martinique
- Tropical Storm Erika (2015) – a weak tropical storm that caused torrential rainfall in Dominica, leading to flooding and landslides
- Hurricane Tammy (2023) – affected the northern Leeward islands a couple weeks after Philippe and made landfall on Barbuda at Category 1 strength
