= List of storms named Philippe =

The name Philippe has been used for four tropical cyclones in the Atlantic Ocean:

- Hurricane Philippe (2005) – a Category 1 hurricane that stayed out in Atlantic Ocean
- Hurricane Philippe (2011) – a Category 1 hurricane that never impacted any land
- Tropical Storm Philippe (2017) – a short-lived and weak tropical storm which affected Cuba and South Florida
- Tropical Storm Philippe (2023) – a long-lived storm that affected the northern Leeward Islands and Bermuda, then made landfall in Maine as an extra-tropical cyclone

== See also ==
Storms with similar names

- Tropical Storm Filipo (2024) – a South-West Indian Ocean severe tropical storm
- Cyclone Phil (1996) – a Category 2 Australian region tropical cyclone that crossed into the South-West Indian Ocean
