= Grande Rivière à Goyaves =

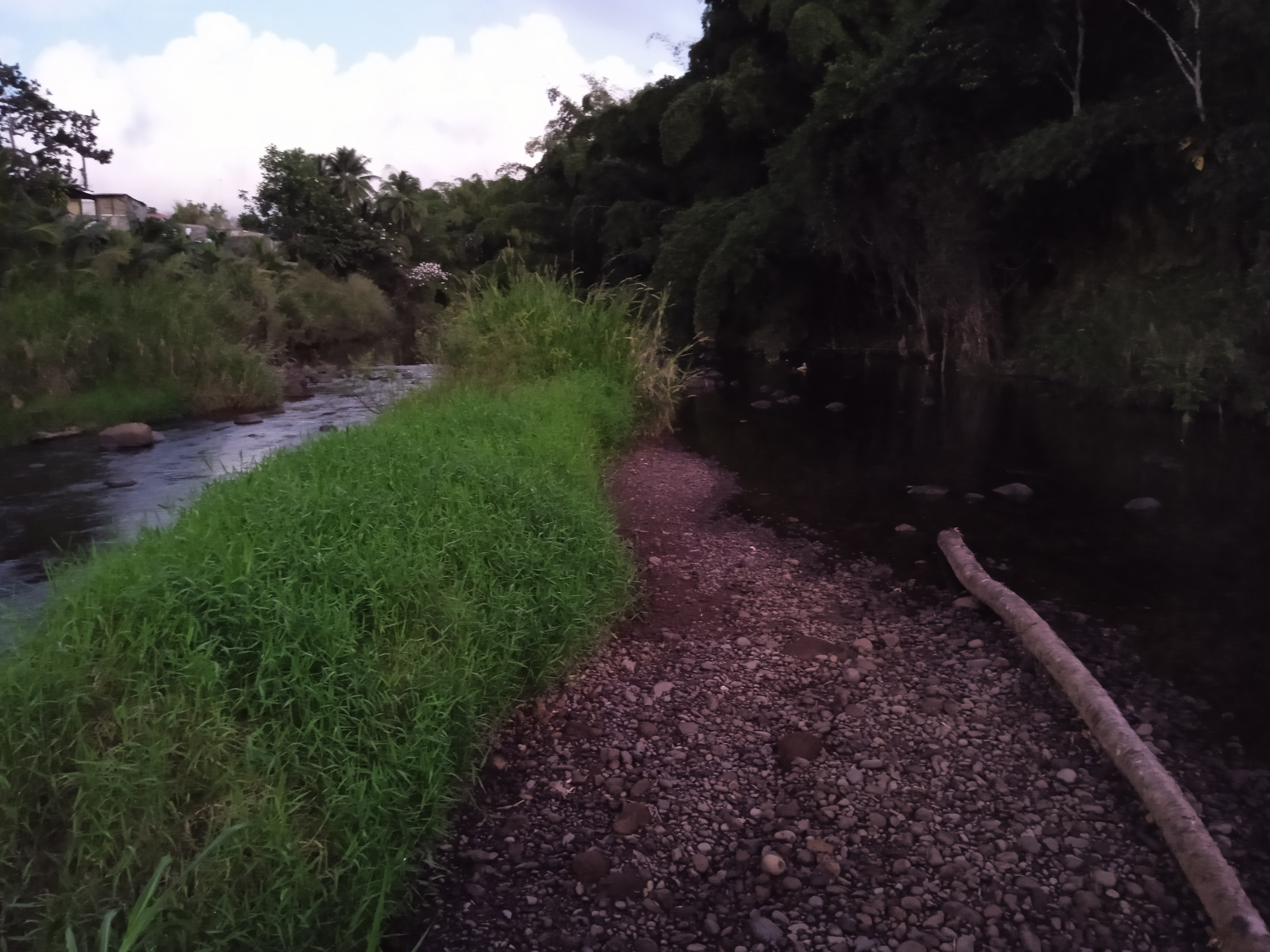
- The Grande Rivière à Goyaves in Ravine Chaude

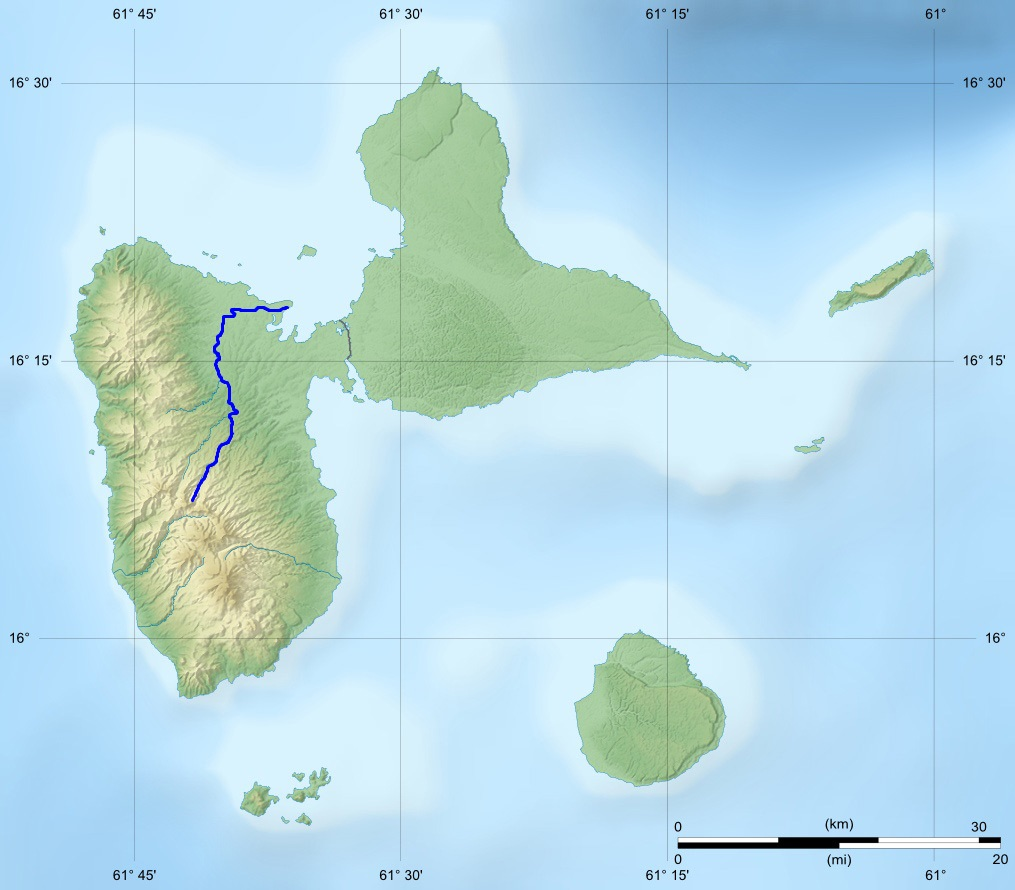
- Map of the course of the river

Location
- Country: France
- Region: Guadeloupe

Physical characteristics
- Source: Morne Bel-Air ou Merwart
  - coordinates: 16.1172°N 61.6958°W
  - elevation: 1,155 m (3,789 ft)
- Mouth: Grand Cul-de-sac marin (Caribbean Sea)
  - coordinates: 16.298111°N 61.605778°W
- Length: 38.7 km (24.0 mi)
- Basin size: 158 km^{2} (61 sq mi)

The Grande Rivière à Goyaves is the longest river in Guadeloupe, found on the island of Basse-Terre.

== Geography ==
The river is 39.5 kilometres (24.5 mi) long. The source of the Grande Rivière à Goyaves has an altitude of 1,155 metres (3,789 ft) on Morne Bel-Air, at the center of the island of Basse-Terre.

The river flows north through the commune of Petit-Bourg, before bifurcating. The main course then traverses a mangrove forest and enters the ocean at Grand Cul-de-sac Marin. It juts out into the bay. In the lesser course, it snakes in the plain and marks the boundary of Sainte-Rose and Lamentin.

It has a watershed of 150 square kilometres (58 sq mi).

== Usage of water ==
Since 1966, a plant has extracted water from the Grand Rivière à Goyaves for drinking purpose.
