= Baluchi =

Baluchi may refer to:

== Places ==
=== Afghanistan ===
- Baluchi, Balkh, Afghanistan
- Balūchī, Helmand, Afghanistan
- Balūchī, Herat, Afghanistan
- Balūchī, Orūzgān, Afghanistan
- Balūchī, Sar-e Pol, Afghanistan

=== Iran ===
- Baluchi, Fars
- Baluchi, Chabahar, Sistan and Baluchestan Province
- Baluchi-ye Bala, Sistan and Baluchestan Province
- Baluchi-ye Pain, Sistan and Baluchestan Province

== Other uses ==
- Balochi language, also known as Baluchi
- Reza Baluchi (born 1972), an Iranian American athlete and activist, inventor of the hydro pod
- Baluchi horse

== See also ==
- Balochi (disambiguation)
- Baluch (disambiguation)
- Balushi (disambiguation)
- Bellucci, an Italian surname
