= Balūchī, Afghanistan =

Baluchi, Afghanistan or Balūchī, Afghanistan may refer to:

- Balūchī, Farah
- Balūchī, Helmand
- Balūchī, Herat
- Balūchī, Orūzgān
- Balūchī, Sar-e Pol
