= Balochi =

Balochi may refer to:

- Balochi language, an Indo-Iranian language of Iran, Pakistan, and Afghanistan

== See also ==
- Baloch
- Baluchi
- Balushi
- Bellucci, an Italian surname
- Balochistan (disambiguation)
