= Balloch =

Balloch may refer to:

== Places ==
=== Scotland ===
==== Pronounced /'bɑləx/ ====
- Balloch, West Dunbartonshire, Scotland
  - Balloch Castle
  - Balloch Country Park
  - Balloch railway station
  - Balloch Central railway station
  - Balloch Pier railway station
- Balloch, Cumbernauld, Scotland
- Kenmore, Scotland, formerly called Balloch

==== Pronounced /bə'lox/ ====
- Balloch, Highland Scotland, a residential village four miles east of the city of Inverness

=== United States ===
==== Pronounced /'bɑːlək/ ====
- Balloch, New Hampshire

== People ==
- Alexander Balloch Grosart (1827–1899), Scottish clergyman and literary editor
- Howard Balloch (21st century), former Canadian diplomat

== See also ==
- Baloch (disambiguation)
- Belloch
