= USCGC Valiant =

Medium endurance cutter

- USCGC Valiant (WMEC-621)

History

United States
- Builder: American Ship Building Company, Lorain, Ohio
- Laid down: 28 February 1966
- Launched: 14 January 1967
- Commissioned: 3 November 1967
- Out of service: 17 June 2025
- Home port: Naval Station Mayport, Jacksonville, Florida
- Identification: MMSI number: 367264000; Callsign: NVAI
- Status: In commission, special status
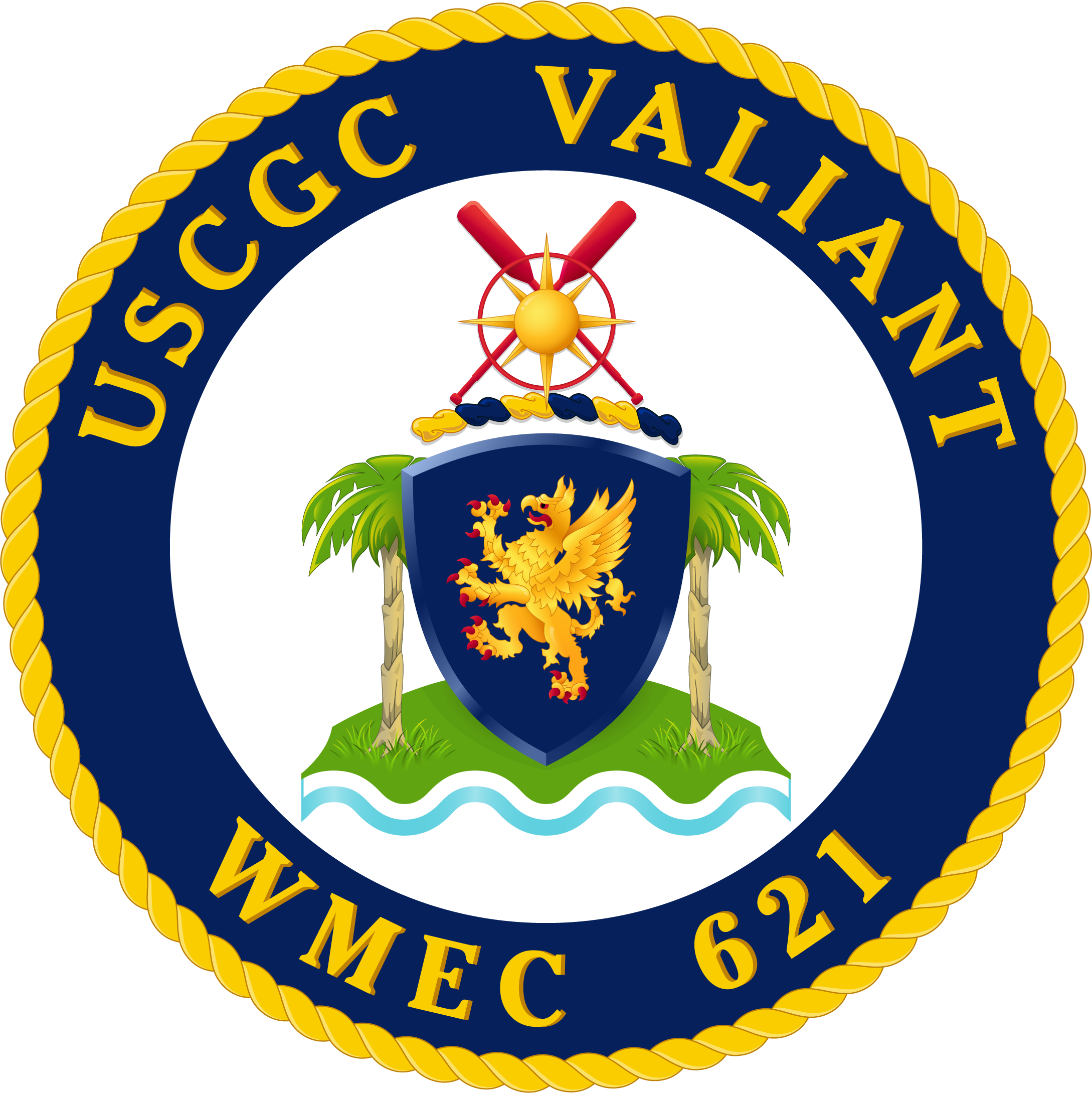
- Badge

General characteristics
- Displacement: 759 tons
- Length: 210 ft 6 in (64.16 m)
- Beam: 34 ft (10 m)
- Draught: 10 ft 6 in (3.20 m) max
- Propulsion: Originally, 2 × Cooper-Bessemer Corporation FVBM-12 turbocharged diesel engines; Currently, 2 × V16 2,550 hp (1,902 kW) ALCO diesel engines
- Speed: 14 knots (26 km/h) cruising; 20 knots (37 km/h) maximum
- Range: 6,100-mile (9,820 km) at cruising speed; 2,700-mile (4,350 km) at max speed
- Boats & landing craft carried: 1 × 23 foot Over The Horizon (OTH); 1 × 24 foot Cutter Boat Large (CBL)
- Complement: 12 officers, 63 enlisted
- Sensors & processing systems: 2 × AN/SPS-64 radar
- Armament: 1 × Mk 38 25 mm machine gun; 2 × M2HB .50 caliber machine gun; 2 × M240 7.62×51mm machine gun
- Aircraft carried: HH-65 Dolphin

USCGC Valiant (WMEC-621) is a United States Coast Guard multi-mission medium endurance cutter in service since 1967 and in commission, special status (that is, inactive) since 17 June 2025. Valiant was most recently home ported in Jacksonville, Florida and operated in the Atlantic Ocean, Caribbean Sea and Gulf of Mexico for the Commander, Coast Guard Atlantic Area. Missions included search and rescue, maritime law enforcement, marine environmental protection, and national defense operations.

== History ==
USCGC Valiant (WMEC-621) was laid down 28 February 1966 at American Ship Building Company, Lorain, Ohio, United States and launched on 14 January 1967. She is the seventh of sixteen cutters of her class. She was commissioned on 3 November 1967 at Galveston, Texas, her first homeport, where she served for 24 years.

In November 1991, Valiant was decommissioned for a mid-life overhaul. On January 7, 1994, Valiant was re-commissioned to her second homeport in Miami Beach, Florida.

On 8 August 2012 Valiant arrived at her new homeport at Naval Station Mayport.

On 17 June 2025 at Jacksonville, Florida, Valiant was removed from active duty and placed in commission, special status. At that time, the Coast Guard planned to deliver Valiant to an inactive shipyard status at the Coast Guard Yard and reassign her crew to other shore and shipboard positions. The time that she would remain in commission, special status was unknown.

== Capabilities ==
Valiant normally carries 12 officers and 63 crewmembers. An important aspect of Valiant's design is the attention given to habitability. The ship has its own galley, sickbay, laundry, sewage treatment system, televisions, radios, and digital satellite television.

Powered by two V16 2,550 hp (1,902 kW) ALCO diesel engines, Valiant is capable of a maximum sustained speed of 18 knots (33 km/h). Valiant is equipped with two controllable-pitch propellers, which makes her highly maneuverable.

Valiant has a 25 mm machine cannon mounted on the bow and is capable of firing high-explosive projectiles at a rate of 180 rounds per minute. In addition, the vessel mounts two .50 caliber heavy machine guns. The 24-foot "Cutter Boat Large" (CBL) and the 23 foot "Over The Horizon" (OTH) are used to visit and board other vessels at sea. The special towing bitt on the fantail allows Valiant to tow vessels up to 10 times her size. Another feature of Valiant is her ability to carry a Coast Guard HH-65 Dolphin helicopter. The helicopter extends the ship's surveillance range for law enforcement and reduces response time for search and rescue mission.

Valiant's mission capabilities are greatly enhanced by sophisticated electronic equipment such as: a Global Positioning System, surface search radar with a computerized collision avoidance system, radio direction finders, fathometers, and different types of radios.

== Operational history ==
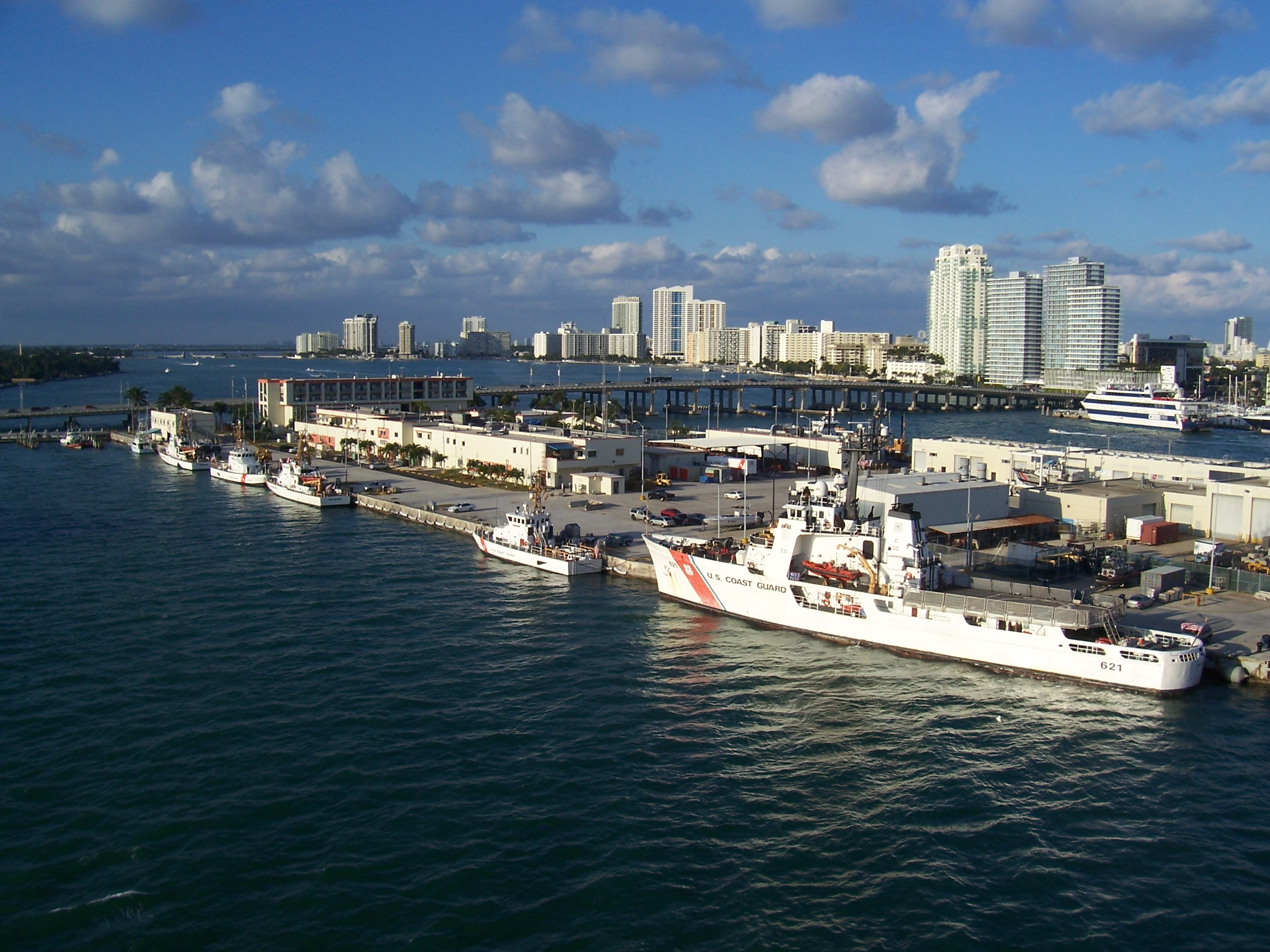
The Valiant docked in Miami.

Valiant played an important role in the 1980 Cuban Boatlift in conjunction with dozens of Coast Guard cutters, small boats, aircraft, and Navy vessels.

On 8 June 1990 the tanker Mega Borg's pump room exploded leaving the ship crippled, on fire and leaking oil. Responding rapidly to an event 60 miles (97 km) offshore, Valiant's crew overcame complex logistical problems to mount an effective fire fighting, salvage and pollution cleanup campaign.

Since 1994, Valiant has been actively engaged in Alien Migration Interdiction Operation (AMIO). Valiant recovered and interdicted over 500 Haitian and Cuban migrants during Operations Able Manner and Able Vigil. Valiant repatriated over 1,900 Haitian migrants from Guantanamo Bay, Cuba to Port au Prince, Haiti over the course of 11 passages.

In 1996, Valiant was Patrol Commander for the Summer Olympic Sailing events in Savannah, Georgia, directing over 29 Coast Guard assets in providing security for 800 athletes from 98 countries. Following the Olympics, Valiant earned an overall excellence award at Refresher Training in Mayport, Florida, with an overall score of 98%. In 1997, Valiant participated in Operation Tradewinds and trained over 500 Caribbean Coast Guard members from 12 countries in damage control, engineering, and seamanship fundamentals.

In January 1999, Valiant escorted the merchant ship Cannes to the coastal waters of Galveston, TX. A boarding team from Valiant helped Law Enforcement Detachment (LEDET) 406 South search Cannes, resulting in the discovery of over 10,000 pounds of cocaine. Next, Valiant sailed to Mayport, Florida, where for the second time in a row the ship earned the Atlantic Area Commander's award for operational readiness at Tailored Ship Training Availability (TSTA) in February 1999.

Just after midnight on 7 November 1999, Valiant discovered a partially submerged vessel with a man on top of the sinking hull and another man floating in the water. The two men had been sailing back to Antigua when their boat started to take on water; soon afterwards a wave had capsized the boat. The two men spent over 30 hours in the water before Valiant's crew rescued them.

In November 1999, approximately 100 miles (160 km) south of St. Croix, Valiant rendezvoused with the British warship HMS Northumberland. A USCG LEDET boarding team aboard Northumberland intercepted the motor vessel Adriatik in the vicinity of Barbados. After three days, the boarding team found two and half tons of cocaine. The boarding concluded with the arrest of 13 crewmembers and the seizure of both the vessel and the cocaine.

During the passage of Hurricane Lenny in November 1999, Valiant led search and rescue efforts for two missing sailing vessels in the vicinity of Saba Island. For two days Valiant faced 10- to 15-foot swells and winds up to 60 knots (111 km/h). Valiant was the on-scene commander supervising the search efforts of 6 Coast Guard cutters and 29 aircraft assets. Valiant and its crew covered over 1250 miles searching for two missing sailboats. Despite locating over eight overturned and capsized vessels adrift in the area, only one survivor was found.

In 2004, Valiant engaged in alien migration interdiction operations during the 2004 Haiti Rebellion near Port-au-Prince. She repatriated 531 Haitians intercepted on boats as they tried flee the growing violence and turmoil fueled by rebel forces intent on removing President Jean-Bertrand Aristide from power.

On 23 January 2010, Valiant assisted in the humanitarian relief efforts following the 2010 Haiti earthquake.

On 24 September 2019, the Coast Guard reported that Valiant, along with four Colombian naval assets, intercepted a 40' long drug-smuggling semi-submersible carrying 12,000 lbs. of cocaine in the Pacific Ocean. The submersible was spotted by maritime aircraft prior to asking Valiant for assistance. The cocaine was estimated to be worth $165 million. Only 1,100 lbs. of the cocaine could be recovered from the submersible before it was sunk due to safety issues. The exact location where the submarine was found was not disclosed. Four men were taken into custody.

On 26 August 2023, the Valiant intercepted a hydro-pod, a watercraft resembling a giant floating hamster wheel, about 70 nautical miles east of Tybee Island, Georgia. Reza Baluchi, the crewman and motor of the hydro-pod, was en route to England. A boarding party from the Valiant approached the hydro-pod and warned Baluchi that Hurricane Franklin was approaching, but Baluchi first threatened to stab himself and then to blow himself up if his vessel was boarded. The following day Valiant's watch over Baluchi was relieved by USCGC Campbell, whose crew eventually persuaded Baluchi to accompany them to Miami Beach.
