= Baloch =

Baloch, also spelled Baloch, Beluch, and in other ways, may refer to:

== Ethnic groups ==
- Baloch people, an ethnic group of Pakistan, Iran and Afghanistan
- Baluch, a small itinerant community of Afghanistan, also known as Baloch

== Films ==
- Baloch (film), a 2023 Indian film
- Baluch (film), a 1972 Iranian film by Masoud Kimiai

== Other uses ==
- Baloch (surname), including a list of people with the name
- Balouch, Azad Kashmir, a tehsil in Sudhanoti district of Pakistani-adminstered Azad Kashmir, also spelt Baloch

== See also ==
- Balloch (disambiguation)
- Baloch F.C. (disambiguation)
- Balochi (disambiguation)
- Balochistan (disambiguation)
- Baluchi (disambiguation)
- Bloch
