= Belushi =

Belushi or Balushi may refer to:

- Belushi (surname)
- Belushi: A Biography, a 2005 biography of John Belushi
- Belushi (film), a 2020 documentary film on John Belushi

== See also ==
- Balushi (disambiguation)
- Belisha (disambiguation)
- Berisha (disambiguation)
