= Berisa =

Berisa may refer to:

- Beriša (disambiguation)
- Berissa
