= Robert J. Yered =

United States Coast Guardsman

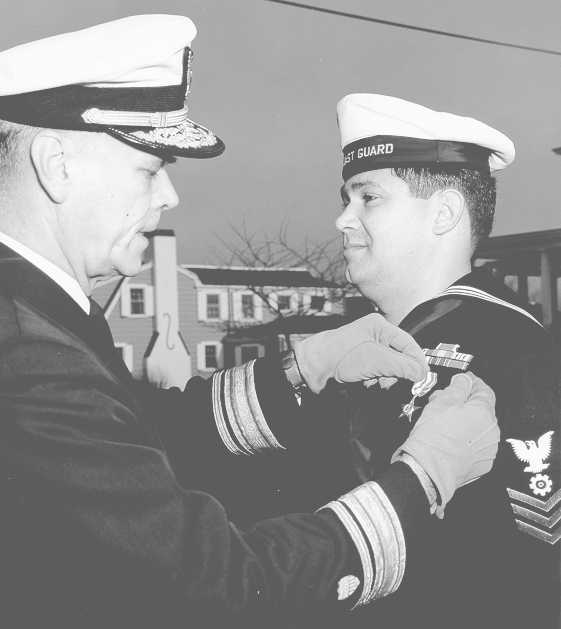
- Yered being awarded the Silver Star as an Engineman First Class
- Born: December 2, 1939; Millis, Massachusetts, U.S.
- Died: January 26, 2009 (aged 69)
- Military career
- Allegiance: United States of America
- Branch: United States Coast Guard
- Rank: Master Chief Petty Officer
- Conflicts: Vietnam War
- Awards: Silver Star, Purple Heart, Vietnam Service Medal

Robert James Yered was a United States coast guardsman who was awarded the Silver Star Medal for his actions during the Vietnam War.

== Career ==
According to the Milford Daily News, his local paper, Yered enlisted in the U.S. Coast Guard at seventeen years old. He rose to the highest enlisted rank, master chief petty officer, prior to his retirement after 24 years of service.

Yered's 82-foot Point-class cutter was moored in a river port at Cát Lái, Vietnam, on February 18, 1968, when the base was attacked by mortars and rockets. According to his official biography:

In the early morning hours the terminal at Cat Lai was attacked by enemy rocket, mortar and small arms fire. As the heavy rounds beat into the terminal, one of the rockets struck a barge carrying several hundred tons of mortar ammunition. The barge was quickly engulfed in flames, and threatened to destroy three nearby ammunition ships carrying more than fifteen thousand tons of explosives.

Engineman Yered courageously exposed himself to enemy gunfire as he helped extinguish fires on the burning barge. His bold act averted not only the destruction of his own ship but also that of the entire terminal.

Yered was also awarded a Purple Heart.

== Personal life ==
After he retired from the U.S. Coast Guard Yered was a groundskeeper at a high school in Massachusetts.

== Legacy ==
In 2010, when the U.S. Coast Guard decided that all the new Sentinel-class cutters would be named after U.S. Coast Guardsmen who had been recognized for their heroism, Yered was one of those to be honored. The fourth cutter in the class was named the USCGC Robert Yered (WPC-1104).

== Notes ==
- Kelley, Michael P. (2002). Where We Were in Vietnam. Hellgate Press, Central Point, Oregon. ISBN 978-1-55571-625-7.
