= Reza Baluchi =

Iranian athlete

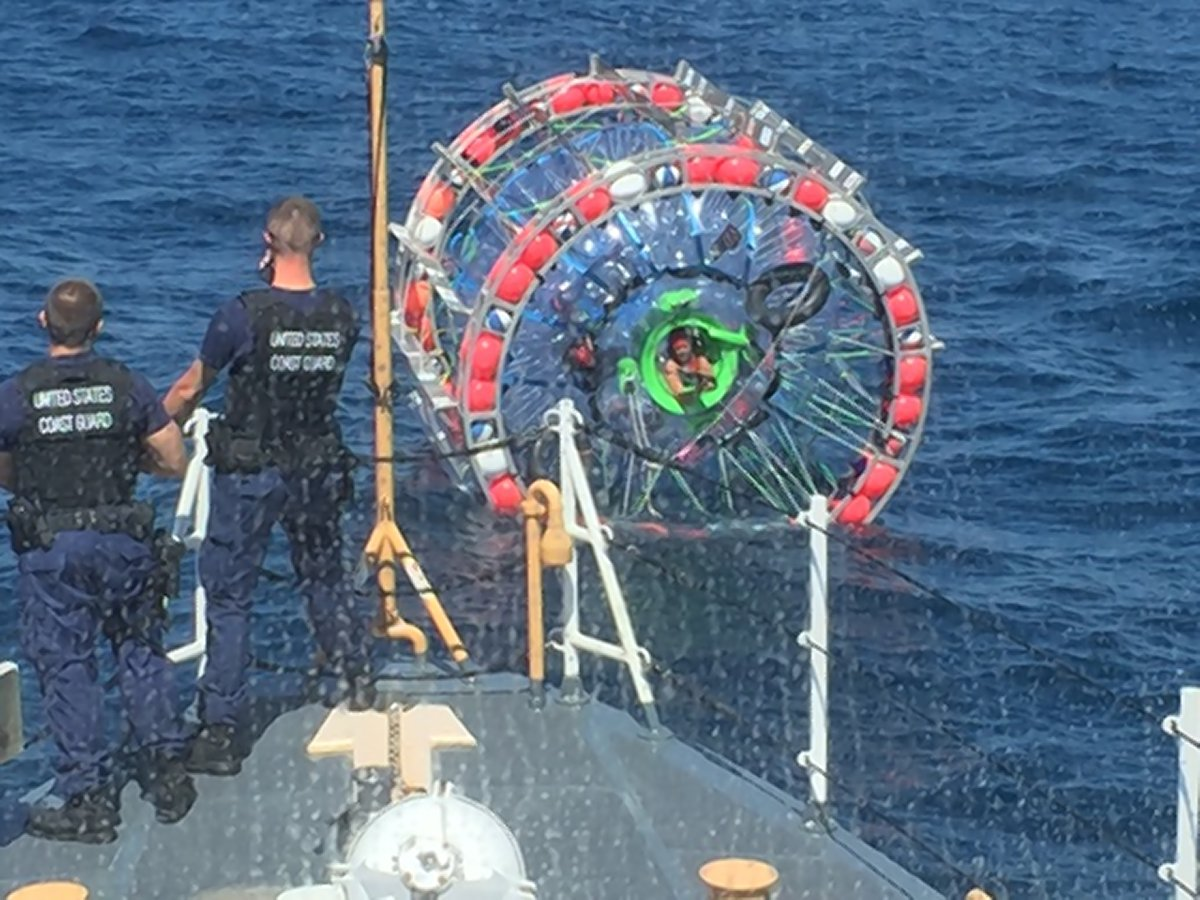
Reza Baluchi in his water craft in 2016, with members of the US Coast Guard

Reza Baluchi (Note: Persian: رضا بلوچی) (born 1972) is an Iranian athlete and activist living in the United States. Several times, he has attempted to travel long distances off the East Coast of the United States in a self-propelled water craft resembling a hamster ball, which he calls a "hydro pod" or bubble.

== Background ==
Reza Baluchi was born in 1972 in Rasht, Iran, to a Baluchi family. He endured torture and served 18 months of a two-year sentence for offenses against Islam; as of October 2014 he is a Catholic. In 1992, after competing as a cyclist for the Iranian national team, he defected to Germany, where he was a member of a professional cycling team and cycled through 55 countries to promote world peace. In 2002, he arrived in the United States from Mexico and was granted political asylum after spending five months in detention. He has set records as both a runner and a cyclist, always with the aim of promoting world peace. In 2003, he ran from Los Angeles to Ground Zero in New York to dispel misconceptions about Middle Easterners and as a stand against terrorism; ran 11,720 miles (18,860 km) around the perimeter of the United States as a fundraiser for Children's Hospital of Denver; ran again from Los Angeles to New York in 2009, acquiring an American flag from the White House; and in 2010 moved to Death Valley, where he ran and trained in the desert heat for two years.

== Bubble expeditions ==
Baluchi built and equipped his first "hydro pod" using $4,500 in savings from working as a mechanic and a dishwasher at a hookah bar and a supermarket in Newport Beach, California. The craft is a cylinder of 3-millimeter thick plastic in an aluminum frame with paddles and is propelled by his running inside it, like a hamster ball. He estimated in 2014 that he could reach 4–5 knots (7.4–9.3 km/h) at sea, and in 2021, 6 knots (11 km/h) in the 10 by 6 feet (3.0 m × 1.8 m) pod he has registered in Florida as a water craft. He has said that he undertakes his ocean journeys to inspire others and to raise money for public services, including the US Coast Guard, which has repeatedly stopped him for his own safety.

=== 2014 attempt to reach Bermuda and Puerto Rico ===
In 2014, after two years of training including a 30-mile (48 km) journey from Newport Beach to Catalina Island, Baluchi set off from Pompano Beach, Florida, intending to trace the Bermuda Triangle by traveling approximately 3,000 miles (4,800 km) to Bermuda, to Puerto Rico, and back to Miami. The Coast Guard had warned him that the expedition was too dangerous, and stopped him approximately 185 miles (298 km) north of his starting point and 70 miles (110 km) offshore of St. Augustine, Florida because he was judged to be in danger. A Coast Guard crew member described him as "fatigued", and he had activated distress beacons; Baluchi said that he accidentally activated his location beacon retrieving a plastic pack of water bottles thrown to him from a crabbing boat. The rescue, in which a ship, a helicopter, and a C-130 airplane were launched, cost approximately $140,000; his water craft with his possessions inside was left adrift and ultimately damaged beyond repair being towed back to shore in rough water.

=== 2016 attempts to reach Bermuda ===
Baluchi spent almost two years working on the crabbing boat to raise $22,000 to build a new hydro pod. In 2015, the Coast Guard denied him permission for another solo expedition. In April 2016, despite a letter from the Coast Guard threatening him with imprisonment and a $40,000 fine if he again embarked on a lengthy water journey without a support boat, he again set off alone from Pompano Beach, planning to travel over about five months to Jacksonville, Bermuda, Haiti, Cuba, Puerto Rico, and Key West before returning to Pompano Beach. His publicist said that he had not wanted to risk endangering the crew of the support boat. On April 24, about two days after starting, he was spotted by the Coast Guard approximately 7 miles (11 km) off the coast of Jupiter, Florida, and agreed to allow his craft to be brought back to shore.

He made a third attempt in July the same year, which he said was to raise money for abused children. A friend towed his craft into international waters; they were forced to return once from 12 miles (19 km) offshore after the Coast Guard inspected the hydro pod and found Baluchi's fire extinguisher was not fully charged. After relaunching 20 miles (32 km) offshore from Jupiter, Baluchi was then allowed by the Coast Guard to proceed but was again stopped that night. After three days floating alongside the cutter Robert Yered, approximately 90 miles (140 km) offshore from Jacksonville, he was brought back to shore and placed in a psychiatric hospital for evaluation; the Coast Guard told the Jacksonville Sheriff's Office that he had threatened to kill himself, and according to Baluchi, Coast Guard personnel shot the buoyancy balls in order to sink his bubble.

=== 2021 attempt to reach New York ===
In July 2021, he embarked from St. Augustine, Florida on a northward journey up the coast to New York, which he expected to last three weeks, but washed up in Flagler County, approximately 30 miles (48 km) south, where he was found by sheriff's deputies and assisted by the Coast Guard. He said that his objective was to raise money for public services including the Coast Guard, police, and fire services, and for homeless people, and that he had cut his journey short after discovering that his backup GPS device and charging cables had been stolen. A Coast Guard spokesman said that by embarking without a support vessel, he was violating a Captain of the Port Order and could be fined up to $95,881.

=== 2023 attempt to reach London ===
In August 2023, Baluchi attempted to cross the Atlantic Ocean to London in a hydro pod. The US Coast Guard first spotted Baluchi on August 26, 70 nautical miles off Tybee Island, Georgia. Finding the vessel "manifestly unsafe", the Coast Guard attempted to coax Baluchi out of his vessel and inform him of the oncoming Hurricane Franklin. The Coast Guard reported that when they asked Baluchi to disembark, Baluchi pulled out a knife and threatened to kill himself. Upon returning the next day, Baluchi reportedly pulled out two knives, held up wires, and threatened to blow himself up—Baluchi admitted the next day that there was no bomb. On August 29, two days after the Coast Guard first made contact, Baluchi agreed to leave his vessel, and he was brought ashore on September 1. On September 5, Baluchi was charged with obstruction of boarding and violation of the Captain of the Port Order. He was released on bond the same day under the condition that he "may not go to the ocean or board a vessel on to the ocean". Baluchi has maintained that his attempted voyage was for charity.
