= Belisha =

Belisha may refer to:

- Amarildo Belisha, Albanian footballer
- Leslie Hore-Belisha, British Liberal politician
  - Belisha beacon, named after him

== See also ==
- Belushi (disambiguation)
- Berisha (disambiguation)
