= Live at Loch Lomond =

Festival held in 2007 and 2008

Live at Loch Lomond was a concert festival that took place at Balloch Country Park in 2007 and 2008.

The inaugural festival took place from August 4 to August 5, 2007. Nearly 30,000 people attended over the two days. Main bands performing were Dirty Pretty Things, Feeder, Starsailor, Supergrass, 2 Many DJs and Sunday's closing act, Faithless.

The dance tent featured Pete Tong, David Guetta and Carl Cox. The Hacienda Classics Tent, celebrating 25 years of one of the world's most famous clubs, was popular on Sunday with DJ sets from Boney, Peter Hook, A Guy Called Gerald.

The Rock DJ Tent which featured Belle & Sebastian, Bez, Ocean Colour Scene, The View and Embrace.

A second Live at Loch Lomond festival was held in the summer of 2008, however it was less successful due to UpFront security staff on site at the festival refusing entry to many fans due to "health and safety reasons" (i.e. lighting was inadequate along a few stretches of walkway) causing many bands (including some local bands who saw this as a great opportunity) to play to as little as 10 people.

It was revealed in a local newspaper that the festival held in 2008 would be the last Live at Loch Lomond, citing the promoters felt that the weather conditions are too poor to run a festival.. There has not been another festival since.
