= Baluchi, Balkh =

Baluchi
- Location in Afghanistan
- Coordinates: 36°21′12″N 66°55′02″E
- Country: Afghanistan
- Province: Balkh Province
- Time zone: + 4.30

Baluchi is a village in Balkh Province in northern Afghanistan.

== See also ==
- Balkh Province
