= Belushi (surname) =

Belushi is an Albanian surname. Notable people with the surname include:

- Alfredo Belushi (1925–2001), Argentine musician
- Fernando Belushi (born 1983), Argentine football player
- Jim Belushi (born 1954), American actor, comedian, and musician; younger brother of John Belushi
- John Belushi (1949–1982), American comedian, actor, and musician; older brother of James Belushi
- Judith Belushi-Pisano (1951–2024), American radio and television producer
- Robert James Belushi (born 1980), American actor; son of Jim Belushi

== Others ==
- Bang Belushi, stage name of Rudolph Rinchere (born 1978), American rapper
