= Balloch Castle =

Historic site in Scotland

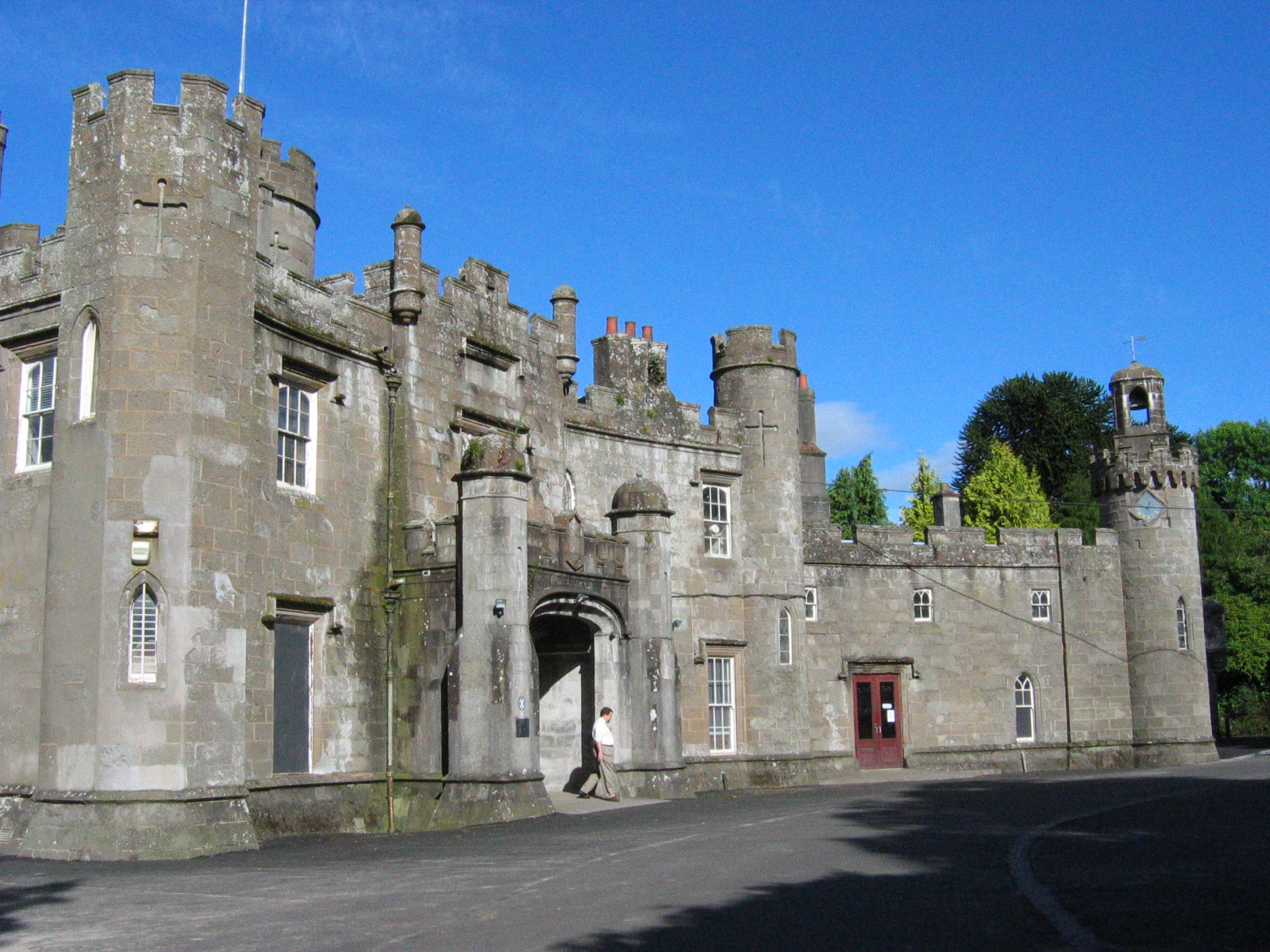
- Entrance front of Balloch Castle

- Location in West Dunbartonshire
- 56.013°N 4.583°W

Listed Building – Category A
- Designated: 14 May 1971
- Reference no.: LB123

Inventory of Gardens and Designed Landscapes in Scotland
- Official name: Balloch Castle
- Designated: 1 July 1987
- Reference no.: GDL00042

Balloch Castle is an early 19th-century country house situated at the southern tip of Loch Lomond, in West Dunbartonshire, Scotland. Balloch was a property of the Lennox family from the 11th century, and the old castle was built in the 13th century. In the 19th century the estate was purchased by John Buchanan of Ardoch, who demolished the ruins of the old castle and erected the present building. The Tudor Gothic architecture is the work of Robert Lugar. In 1915 Balloch was bought by Glasgow City Corporation, and has been leased by West Dunbartonshire Council since 1975. The estate was designated as a country park in 1980, and since 2002 has been part of Loch Lomond and The Trossachs National Park. Although the house has been periodically used for visitor facilities and council offices, it is now included on the Buildings at Risk Register. Balloch Castle is a category A listed building, and the estate is included on the Inventory of Gardens and Designed Landscapes in Scotland.

== History ==
=== The old castle ===
The lands of Balloch were granted to the Lennox family in 1072 by King Malcolm III, forming part of the ancient earldom of Lennox. The earls of Lennox built the original Balloch Castle around 1238, and held it until approximately 1390. Many of their early charters were dated at Balloch. The earls afterwards moved their base to the island of Inchmurrin in Loch Lomond, where the remains of a late 14th-century castle can still be seen. Situated nearer the water than the present day castle, there are no standing remains, the earthworks can still be seen. An irregular mound, approximately 50 by 45 metres (164 by 148 ft), surrounded by a ditch up to 5 metres (16 ft) across. This site is given statutory protection as a scheduled monument.

In the 15th century Balloch, along with the earldom of Lennox, came to the Stewarts of Darnley. It stayed in the Stewart family until 1652 when the 4th Duke of Lennox sold it to John Colquhoun of Luss.

=== Balloch Castle ===
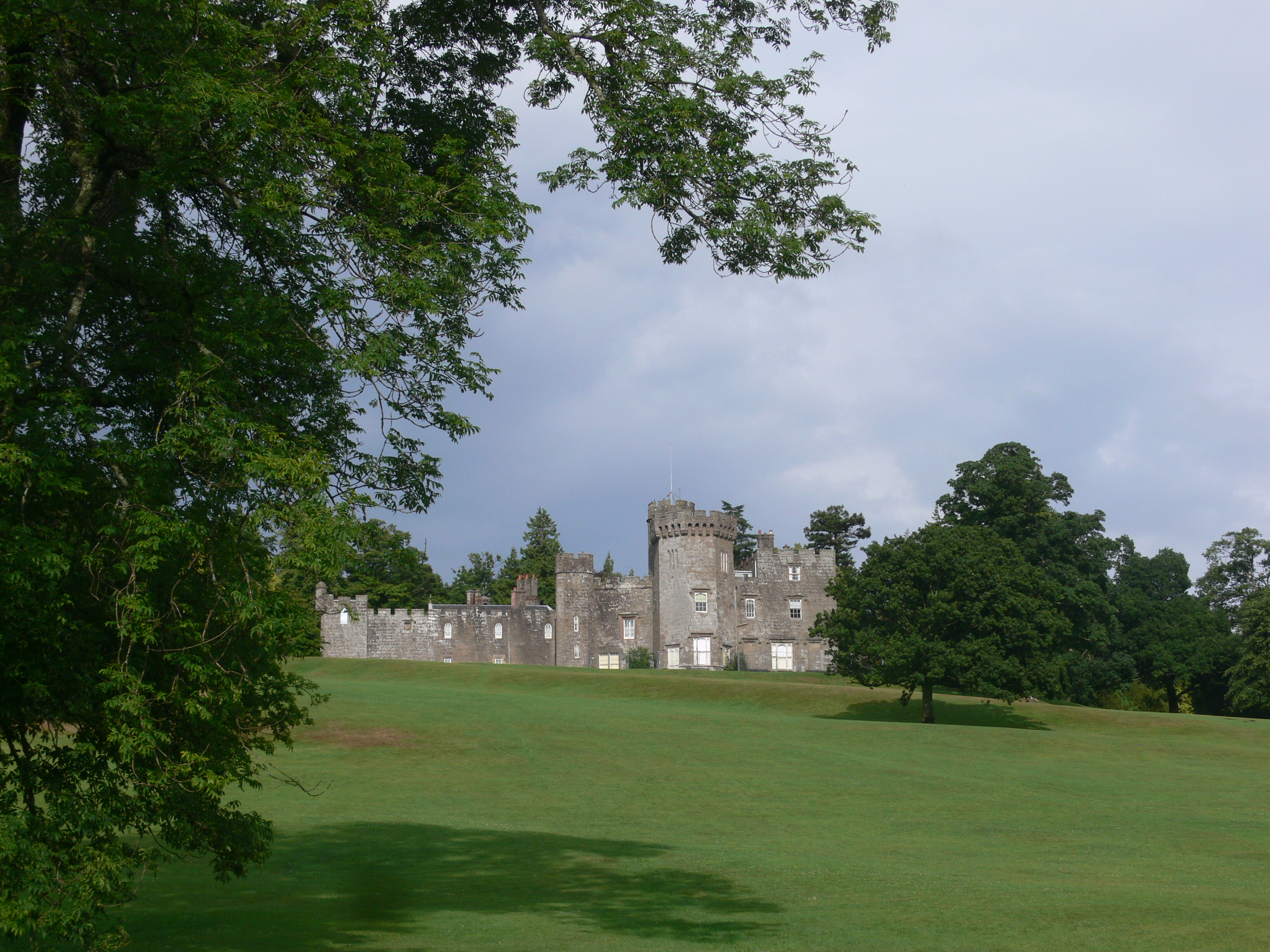
The garden front of Balloch, seen across the parkland

The present castle was built as a residence in 1808–1809 at the order of John Buchanan of Ardoch (1761–1839), who had bought the estate in 1800. Buchanan was a Glasgow merchant, the son of Thomas Buchanan of Ardoch (died 1789). John Buchanan was involved in his father's hat-making business, and also like his father was a partner in the Ship Bank, Glasgow's oldest banking house, founded in 1749. He represented Dunbartonshire in parliament from 1821 to 1826.

The architect of the Tudor Gothic building was London-based Robert Lugar, who had designed the nearby Tullichewan Castle in 1792. The building's turrets and crenellations are purely decorative with no defensive value. The lancet windows, tracery, hoodmoulds and blind arrow-slits are all borrowings from earlier building styles. Although an unimaginative designer, at Balloch Lugar helped to introduce the asymmetrical, "picturesque" form of castellated house into Scotland. The new castle may incorporate stone from the earlier castle, or the fabric of an earlier building on the site. Buchanan established the parkland around the castle, including the planting of ornamental trees and imported shrubs.

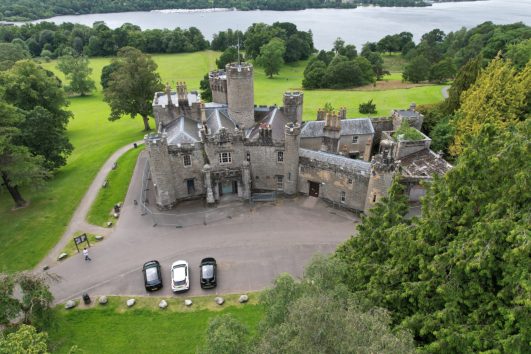

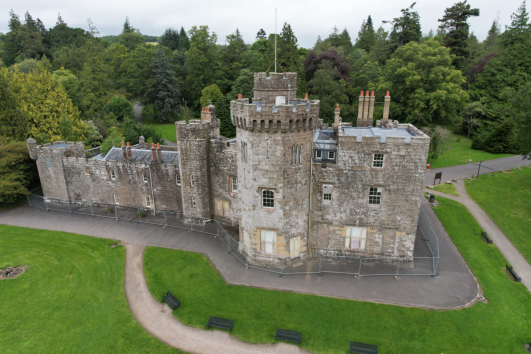

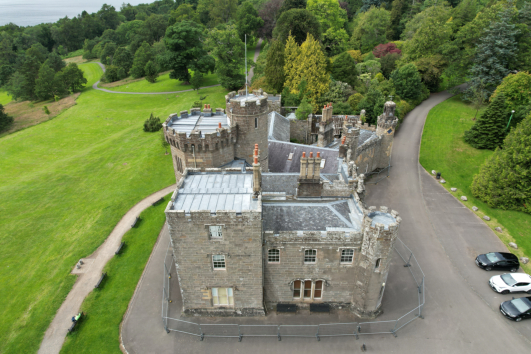

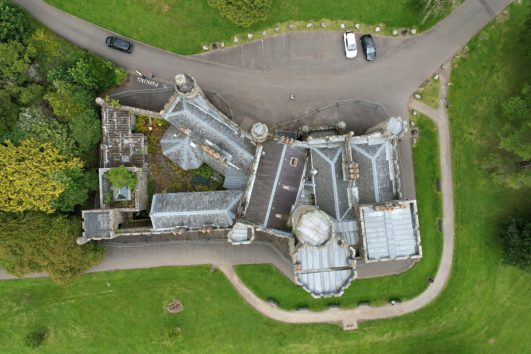

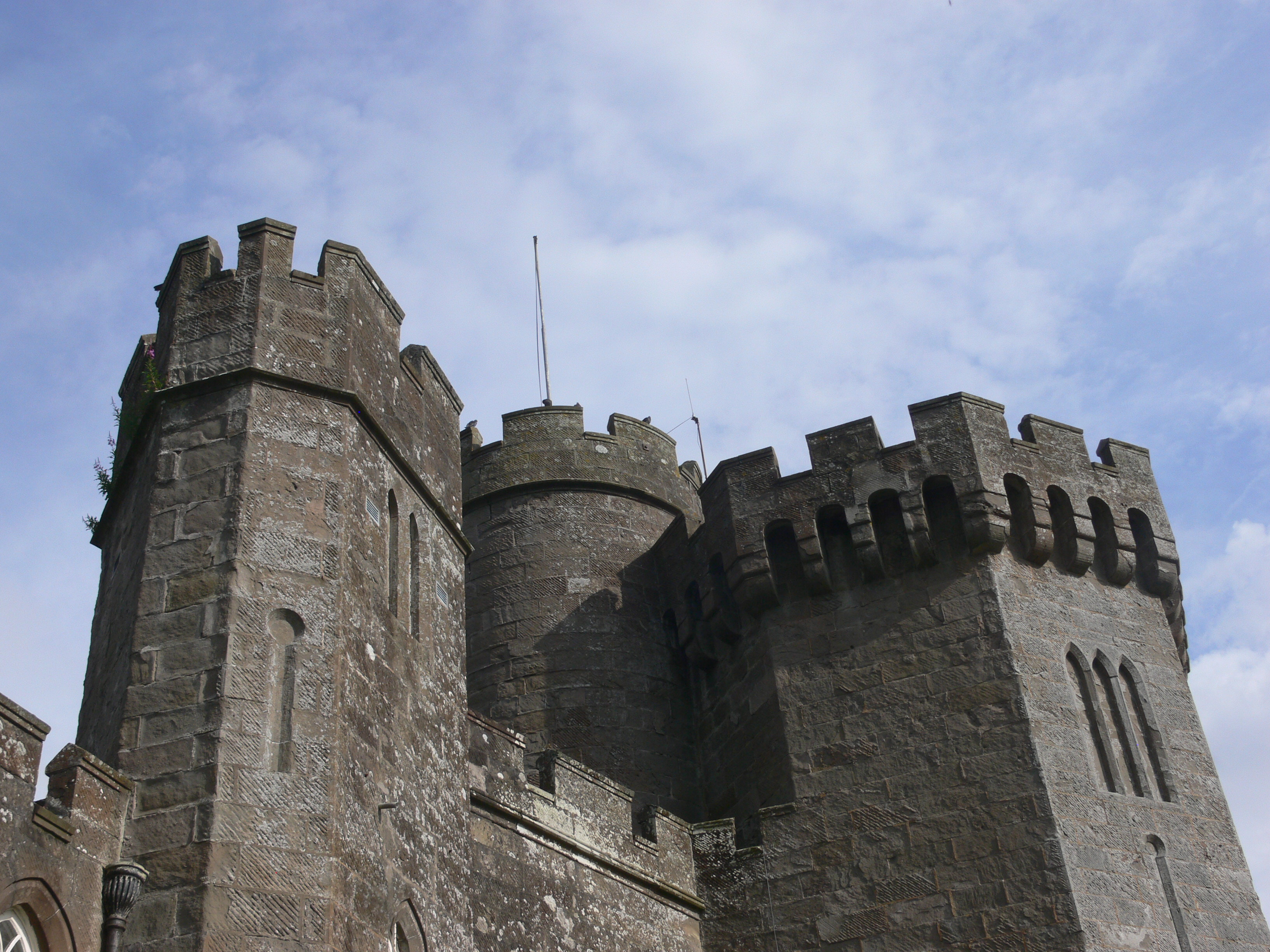
Ornamental crenellations and blind arrow-slits

=== Later history ===
In 1830, Buchanan purchased the adjacent estate of Boturich, including a ruined castle 1 mile (1.6 km) north of Balloch Castle. He again engaged Robert Lugar to rebuild the castle, which he then occupied, selling Balloch. The latter passed through several owners in the 19th century, including Mr Gibson Stott, who made further improvements to the parks, and the Denniston-Brown family. The estate, comprising 815 acres (330 ha), was purchased in 1915 by the Corporation of the City of Glasgow, the predecessor of the current city council, to provide publicly accessible open space. Although still owned by Glasgow City Council, the park and house have been leased to Dunbarton District Council, and its successor West Dunbartonshire Council, since 1975. It was registered as a country park in 1980. The house has been a category A listed building since 1971.

The house has periodically been used to provide visitor facilities and offices, with past occupants including the Nature Conservancy Council and the local Countryside Ranger Service. By 2008 the building was in poor condition, and was added to the Buildings at Risk Register for Scotland. In January 2014, an application for listed building consent was lodged, to permit repairs to the now-disused structure. In February 2014 West Dunbartonshire Council announced a programme of repairs to preserve the building.

== Estate ==
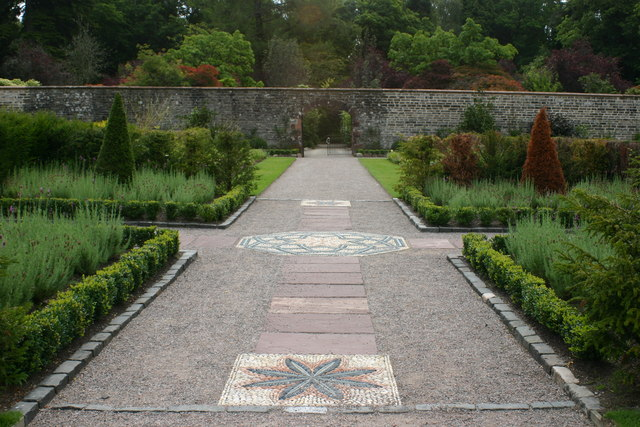
Walled garden within the grounds

The castle grounds feature two main pleasure gardens, one to the north of the house including rhododendrons and azaleas that reach full bloom in late May and early June. To the south is a walled garden planted with flowers and shrubs, and surrounded by the second area of ornamental planting. Between these two areas, and sweeping down to the loch shore, is an area of grassed parkland with specimen trees. The whole is framed by ornamental and semi-natural woodlands. In 2001, a £2.3-million programme of works sought to restore the castle grounds, including the reopening of lost views and improved woodland management. Funding was provided by the Heritage Lottery Fund and Scottish Enterprise, as well as the council.
