= Berisha =

Berisha may refer to:

- Berisha (tribe), a historical Albanian tribe and region
- Berisha (surname)
- Berisha (village), a village in Kosovo

== See also ==
- Belisha (disambiguation)
- Belushi (disambiguation)
