= USCGC Robert Yered =

US Coast Guard cutter

USCGC Robert Yered (WPC-1104)
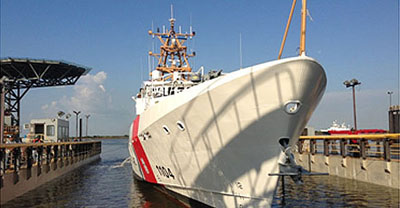
- Robert Yered conducts familiarization training at Port Fourchon, Louisiana in October 2012.

History

United States
- Name: USCGC Robert Yered
- Namesake: Robert James Yered
- Operator: United States Coast Guard
- Builder: Bollinger Shipyards, Lockport, Louisiana, U.S.
- Launched: March 2, 2012
- Acquired: November 17, 2012
- Commissioned: February 15, 2013
- Identification: MMSI number: 338926404; Callsign: NAGP; Hull number: WPC-1104
- Motto: A heritage of gallantry
- Status: in active service
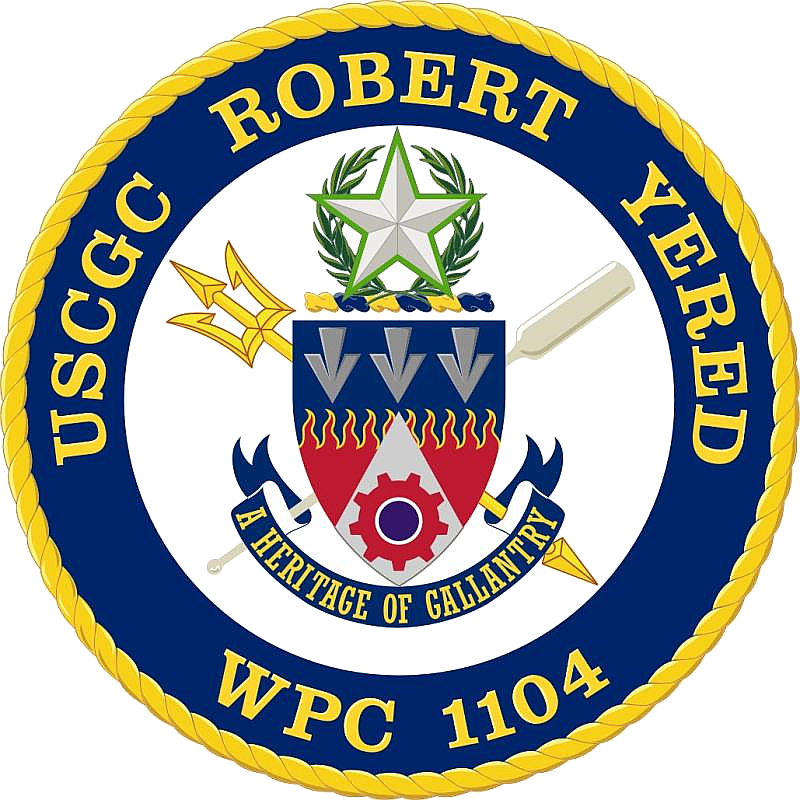
- Badge

General characteristics
- Class & type: Sentinel-class cutter
- Displacement: 353 long tons (359 t)
- Length: 46.8 m (154 ft)
- Beam: 8.11 m (26.6 ft)
- Depth: 2.9 m (9.5 ft)
- Propulsion: 2 × 4,300 kW (5,800 shp); 1 × 75 kW (101 shp) bow thruster
- Speed: 28 knots (52 km/h; 32 mph)
- Range: 2,500 nautical miles (4,600 km; 2,900 mi)
- Endurance: 5 days,
- Boats & landing craft carried: 1 × Short Range Prosecutor RHIB
- Complement: 2 officers, 20 crew
- Sensors & processing systems: L-3 C4ISR suite
- Armament: 1 × Mk 38 Mod 2 25 mm automatic gun; 4 × crew-served Browning M2 machine guns

USCGC Robert Yered (WPC-1104) is a Sentinel-class cutter based in Miami, Florida. She was launched on November 23, 2012, and was commissioned on February 15, 2012. Debbie Wasserman Schultz, the Congressional Representative for the district containing the vessel's base, met the ship when she arrived in Miami on January 27, 2013.

== Design ==
Like her sister ships, she is equipped for coastal security patrols, interdiction of drug and people smugglers, and search and rescue. Like the smaller Marine Protector class she is equipped with a stern launching ramp. The ramp allows the deployment and retrieval of her high speed water-jet powered pursuit boat without first coming to a stop. Robert Yered is capable of more than 25 knots (46 km/h; 29 mph). She is armed with a remote controlled 25 mm (1 in) M242 Bushmaster autocannon and four crew-served Browning M2 machine guns.

== Operational career ==
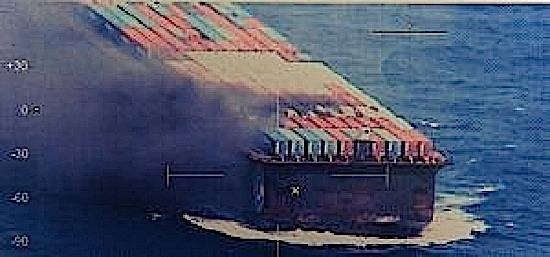
Robert Yered responded to a fire on barge full of containers on March 6, 2014.

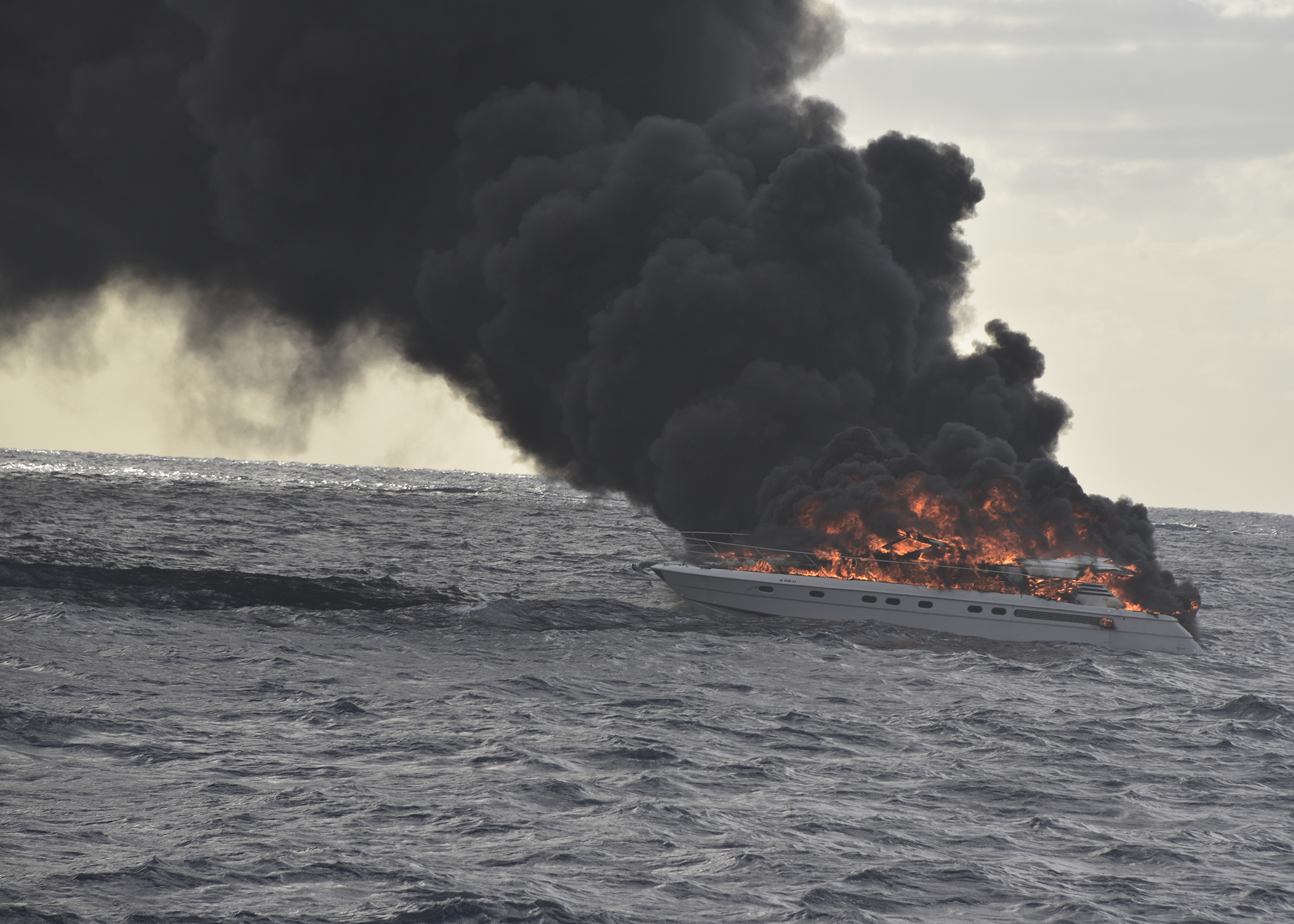
Robert Yered rescued boaters when their vessel burned 30 miles off Miami, 2018-12-07.

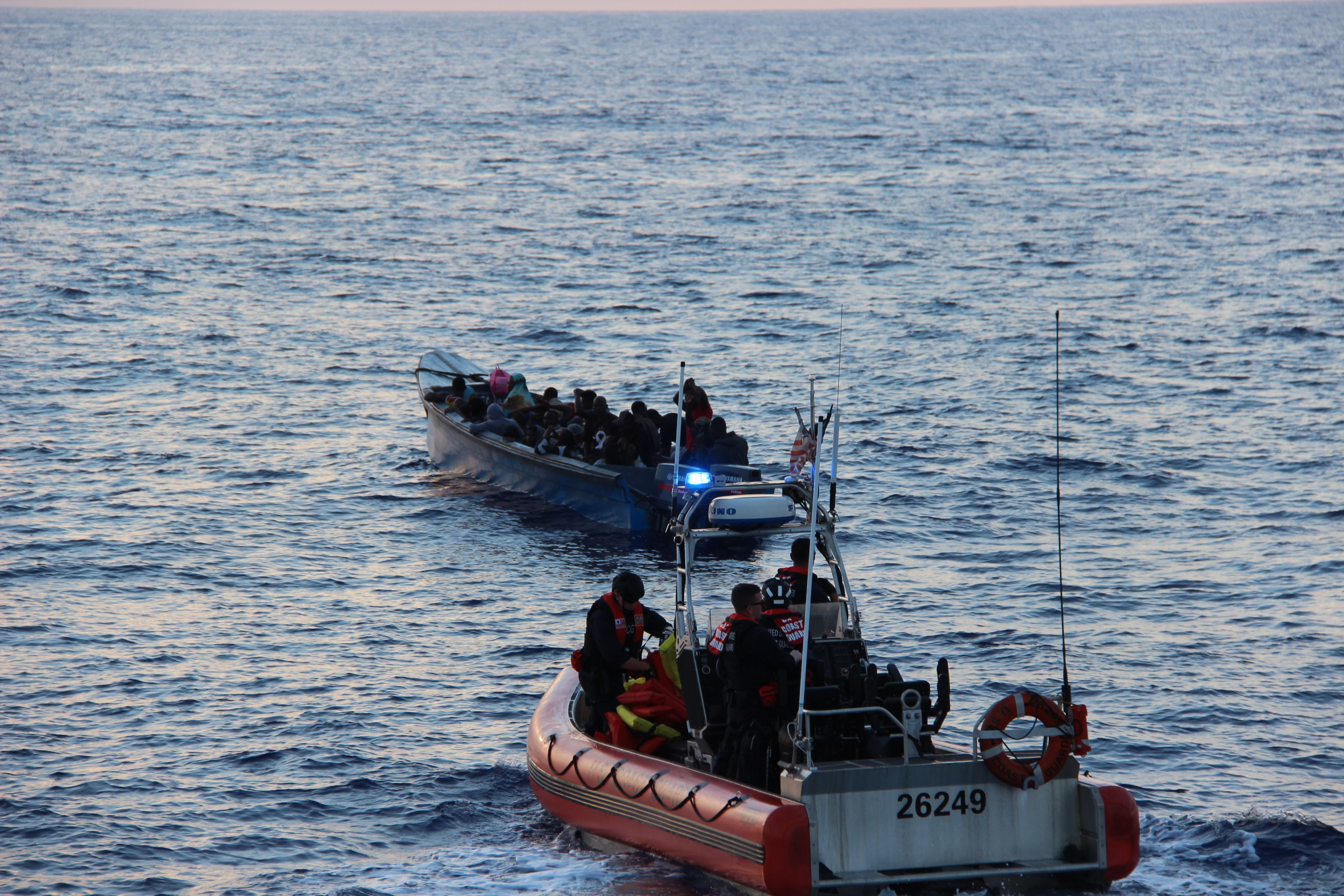
A Robert Yered small boat crew approaches a 30-foot panga vessel with 50 Haitian migrants aboard approximately 46 miles north of Cap Haïtien, Haiti, May 20, 2019.

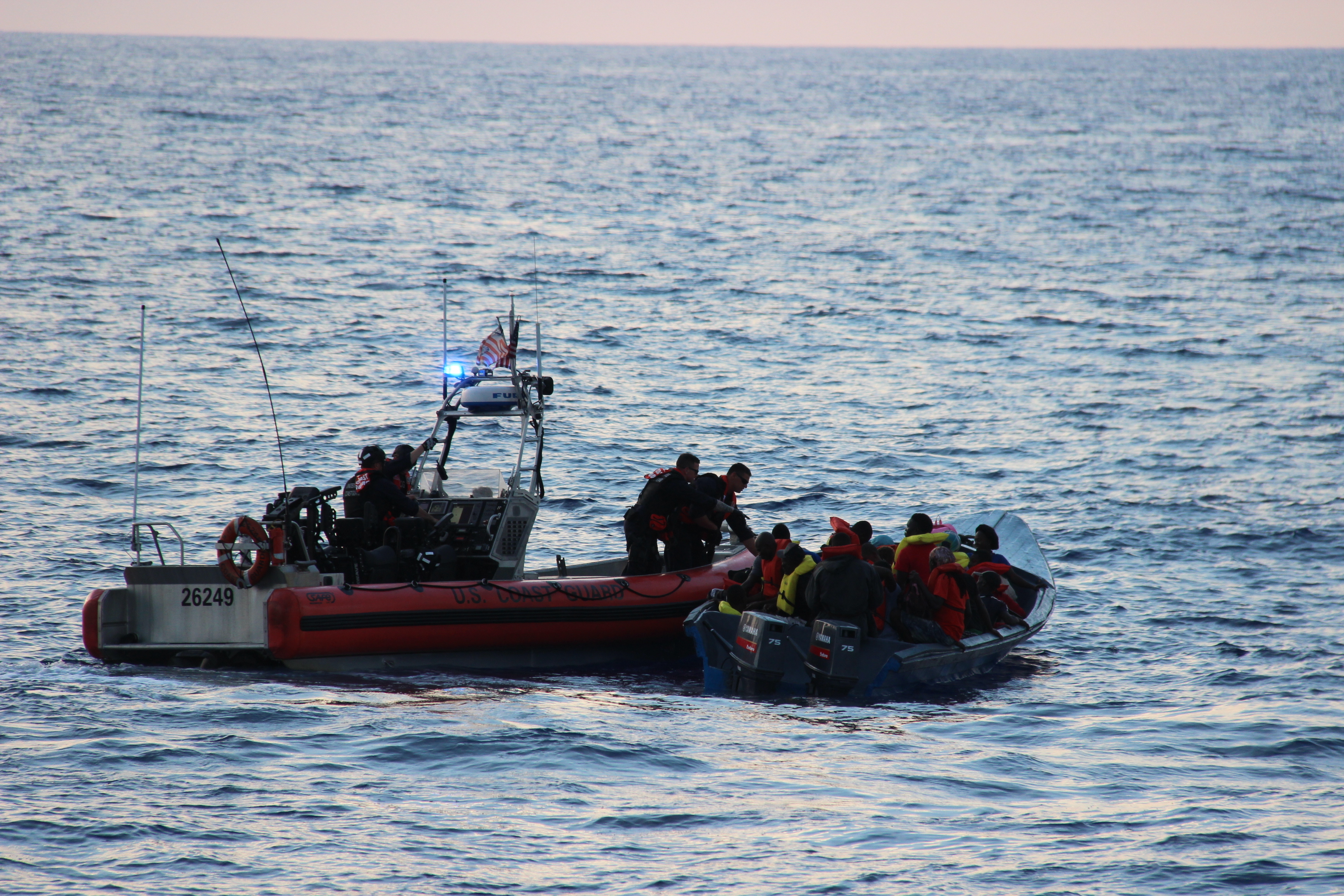
A Robert Yered small boat crew gives life jackets to 50 Haitian migrants approximately 46 miles north of Cap Haïtien, Haiti, May 20, 2019.

On March 6, 2014, Robert Yered responded to a distress call from the ocean-going tug Patriarch, when containers on a large barge it was pushing burst into flame.

On April 28, 2018, Robert Yered, and another nearby vessel, rescued the five crewmembers of the fishing vessel La Bella.

The owners of the 60 feet (18 m) pleasurecraft Family Time reported a fire had been triggered in their engine room, at 3:20pm, December 7, 2018. They placed the distress call approximately 30 miles (48 km) off Miami Beach. They abandoned ship. Robert Yered was nearby, and was able to rescue all three survivors mere minutes after the distress call was placed.

On 20 May 2019, Robert Yered detected an overloaded 30-foot panga vessel and launched a smallboat crew to investigate. The smallboat crew then boarded the vessel and discovered 50 Haitian migrants, including 36 Haitian males and 14 Haitian females. Robert Yered crew safely embarked the migrants and then sank the unsafe vessel to prevent a hazard to navigation. The 50 migrants were then transferred to USCGC Vigilant (WMEC-617), which subsequently repatriated the migrants back to Haiti.

== Namesake ==
She is named after Engineman First Class Robert J. Yered of the U.S. Coast Guard, who put out a fire on an ammunition barge while assigned with a U.S. Coast Guard Explosive Loading Detachment at Cat Lai, South Vietnam during the Vietnam War. Yered was awarded a Silver Star by the U.S. Army for his heroism.

== Notes ==
=== Sources ===
- Kelley, Michael P. (2002). Where We Were in Vietnam. Central Point, Oregon: Hellgate Press. ISBN 978-1-55571-625-7.
