= Baluchi-ye Bala =

Baluchi-ye Bala بلوچي بالا
- Village
- Location within Iran
- Coordinates: 25°33′52″N 61°10′26″E
- Country: Iran
- Province: Sistan and Baluchestan
- County: Chabahar
- Bakhsh: Polan
- Rural District: Polan

Population (2006)
  - Total: 610
- Time zone: UTC+3:30 (IRST)
  - Summer (DST): UTC+4:30 (IRDT)

Baluchi-ye Bala (Persian: بلوچي بالا, also Romanized as Balūchī-ye Bālā; also known as Balūchī-ye Bālā’ī) is a village in Polan Rural District, Polan District, Chabahar County, Sistan and Baluchestan Province, Iran. At the 2006 census, its population was 610, in 107 families.
