= Balloch Country Park =

Country park in West Dunbartonshire, Scotland

Coordinates: 56°0′45″N 4°35′7″W

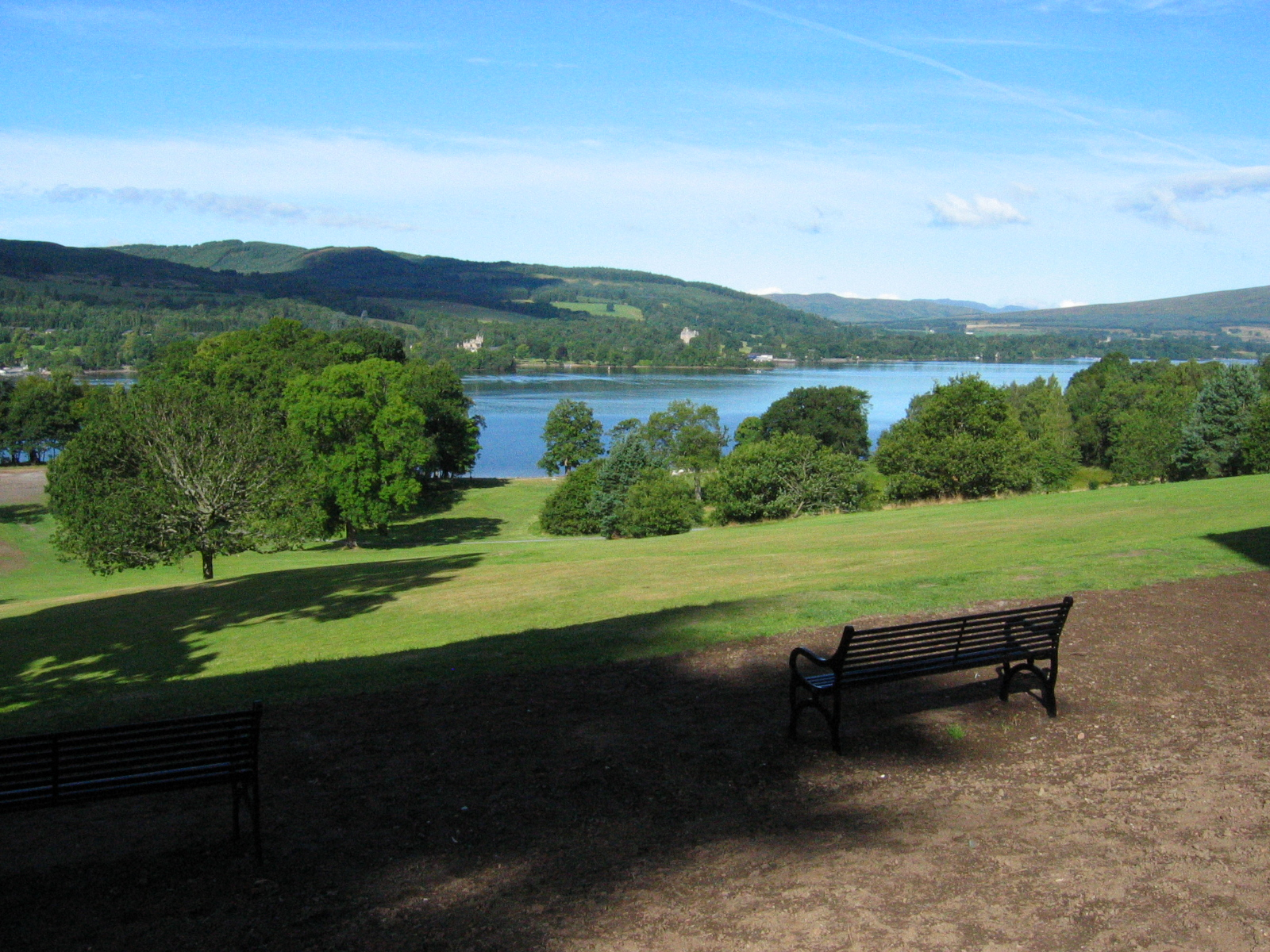
Balloch Country Park

Balloch Castle Country Park is a 200-acre (0.81 km^{2}) country park on the southern tip of Loch Lomond in West Dunbartonshire, Scotland. It was recognised as a country park in 1980, and it is the only country park in the Loch Lomond and the Trossachs National Park, Scotland's first national park. Balloch Castle Country Park features nature trails, guided walks, a walled garden, and picnic lawns with views of the Loch. It was originally developed in the early 19th century by John Buchanan, a partner in the Glasgow and Ship Bank, and the gardens were significantly improved by the Dennistoun-Browns, who bought the estate in 1851. Buchanan also built Balloch Castle, which now serves as the park's visitors' center.

== Balloch Castle ==
Balloch Castle was built in the Scottish baronial style as a residence in 1808 by the architect Robert Lugar at the order of John Buchanan of Ardoch.

The new castle used stone from an earlier castle built near the current site by the Earl of Lennox in 1238 and occupied by the Lennox family until approximately 1390. Situated nearer the water than the present day castle, the only remnant of the original structure is a mound that once formed the moat. This site is given statutory protection under the Ancient Monuments and Archaeological Areas Act 1979.

The current castle used to serve visitors centre and the headquarters of the Countryside Ranger Service in the park, but now lies derelict. The castle grounds offers a car park and walled garden with trees and shrubs, including the rhododendrons and azaleas that reach full bloom in late May and early June.

== Events ==
Balloch Park is host to the annual Loch Lomond Highland games each summer. Events such as caber tossing and typical Scottish cuisine attract many visitors.

In June 1991 Scottish folk-rock band Runrig played to an audience of 50,000. Oasis played a gig to 80,000 people over two nights in the summer of 1996, as did R.E.M. in 2005.

BBC Radio 1 roadshow used the park as a location for annual live shows in the 90's with Travis, Skunk Anansie, Billie Piper and Jason Donovan playing.

In August 2007 the first Live at Loch Lomond music festival took place in the grounds of the park. The second Live At Loch Lomond was also a success generating respect from the crowd.
