= Baloch F.C. =

Baloch F.C. may refer to

- Baloch Nushki F.C.
- Baloch Quetta F.C.
