= Balochistan-e Shutavar =

Balochistan-e Shutavar بلوچستان شوتاور
- village
- Location within Iran
- Coordinates: 31°11′21″N 50°23′15″E
- Country: Iran
- Province: Kohgiluyeh and Boyer-Ahmad
- County: Kohgiluyeh
- Bakhsh: Charusa
- Rural District: Tayebi-ye Sarhadi-ye Gharbi

Population (2006)
  - Total: 145
- Time zone: UTC+3:30 (IRST)
  - Summer (DST): UTC+4:30 (IRDT)

Balochistan-e Shutavar (Persian: بلوچستان شوتاور, also romanized as Balōchistān-e Shūtāvar; also known as Balōchestān Yek) is a village in Tayebi-ye Sarhadi-ye Gharbi Rural District, Charusa District, Kohgiluyeh County, Kohgiluyeh and Boyer-Ahmad Province, Iran. At the 2006 census, its population was 145, in 28 families.
