= Baluchi-ye Pain =

Baluchi-ye Pain بلوچي پائين
- Village
- Location within Iran
- Coordinates: 25°33′41″N 61°10′51″E
- Country: Iran
- Province: Sistan and Baluchestan
- County: Chabahar
- Bakhsh: Polan
- Rural District: Polan

Population (2006)
  - Total: 369
- Time zone: UTC+3:30 (IRST)
  - Summer (DST): UTC+4:30 (IRDT)

Baluchi-ye Pain (Persian: بلوچي پائين, also Romanized as Balūchī-ye Pā’īn) is a village in Polan Rural District, Polan District, Chabahar County, Sistan and Baluchestan Province, Iran. At the 2006 census, its population was 369, in 58 families.
