= Balushi =

Balushi may be:

- an alternative spelling of Baluchi
- Al-Balushi, a surname

== See also ==
- Belushi (disambiguation)
