= List of storms named Franklin =

The name Franklin has been used for four tropical cyclones in the Atlantic Ocean, replacing Floyd after 1999. It has also been used for a European windstorm.

In the Atlantic:

- Tropical Storm Franklin (2005) – formed over the Bahamas, then moved erratically in the open ocean, never affecting land directly; twice approached hurricane status.
- Tropical Storm Franklin (2011) – weak tropical storm that never threatened land.
- Hurricane Franklin (2017) – made landfall on the Yucatán Peninsula as a moderate tropical storm, then made a second landfall in Veracruz, Mexico as a Category 1 hurricane.
- Hurricane Franklin (2023) – a large, strong, long-lived Category 4 hurricane that made landfall in Hispaniola as a tropical storm.

In Europe:

- Storm Franklin – a European windstorm which impacted Western Europe.
