= Hurricane Franklin (2023) =

Category 4 Atlantic hurricane

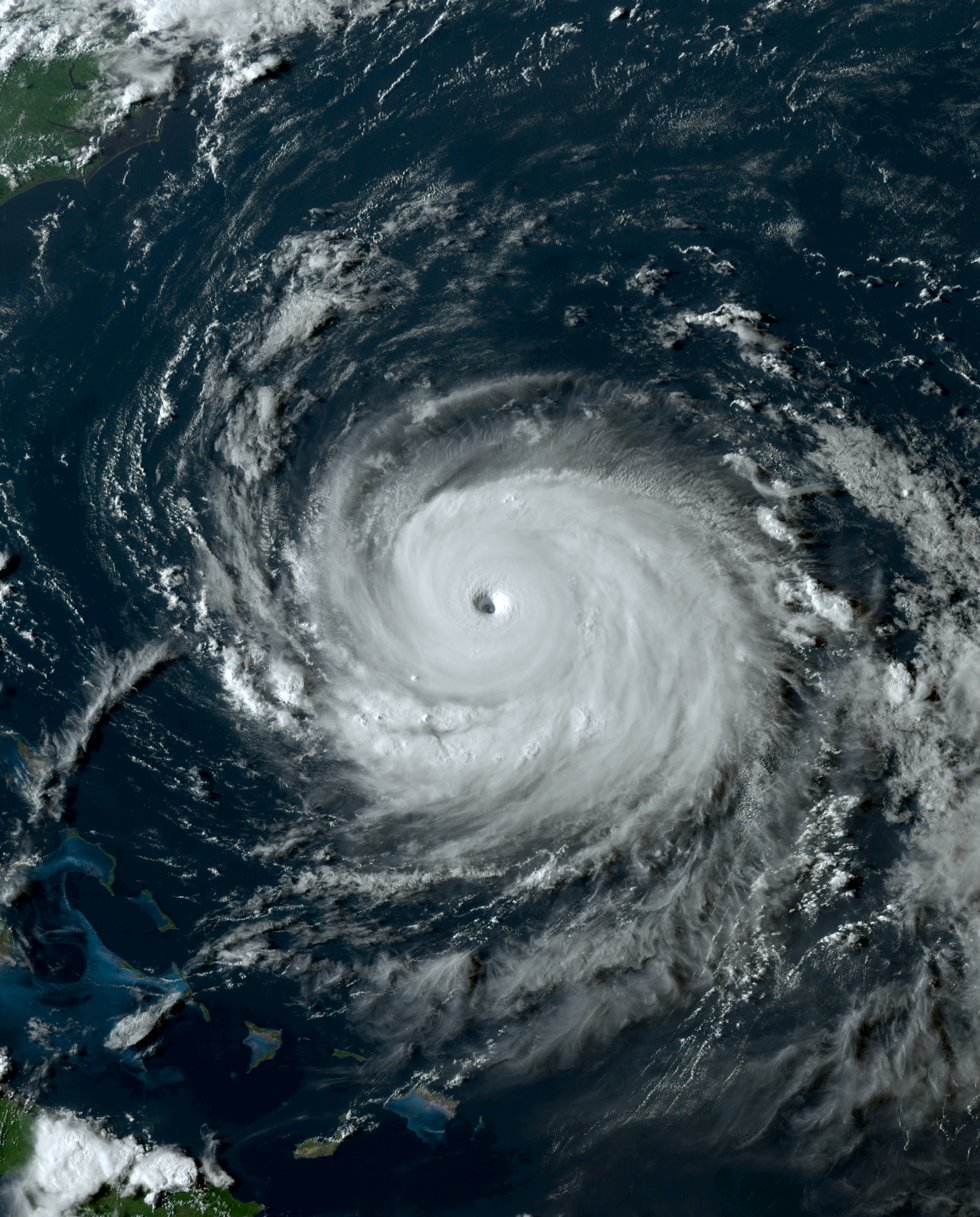
- Franklin shortly before attaining peak intensity on August 28

Meteorological history
- Formed: August 20, 2023
- Extratropical: September 1, 2023
- Dissipated: September 10, 2023

Category 4 major hurricane
- 1-minute sustained (SSHWS/NWS)
- Highest winds: 150 mph (240 km/h)
- Lowest pressure: 926 mbar (hPa); 27.34 inHg

Overall effects
- Fatalities: 2
- Missing: 1
- Damage: $90 million (2023 USD)
- Areas affected: Leeward Islands; Hispaniola; Puerto Rico; Turks and Caicos Islands; Bermuda; Azores
- Part of the 2023 Atlantic hurricane season

Hurricane Franklin was a long-lived and powerful tropical cyclone that brought tropical-storm force winds to parts of the Greater Antilles and Bermuda. The sixth named storm, second hurricane and first major hurricane of the 2023 Atlantic hurricane season, Franklin impacted Hispaniola as a tropical storm before strengthening into a high-end Category 4 hurricane several days later. Possessing a large wind field, the hurricane produced tropical storm force winds over Bermuda and soon became extratropical as it accelerated into the open northern Atlantic Ocean. The extratropical cyclone persisted for several more days before dissipating on September 10.

Franklin brought heavy rainfall and winds to the Dominican Republic, causing damage to buildings, homes, and light posts. Two fatalities were reported in the country, with an additional person also missing. At least 350 people were displaced, and more than 500 homes and 2,500 roads were affected or damaged. Several communities were cut off from transportation, and nearly 350,000 homes were left without power, with an additional 1.6 million homes cut off from potable water.

== Meteorological history ==
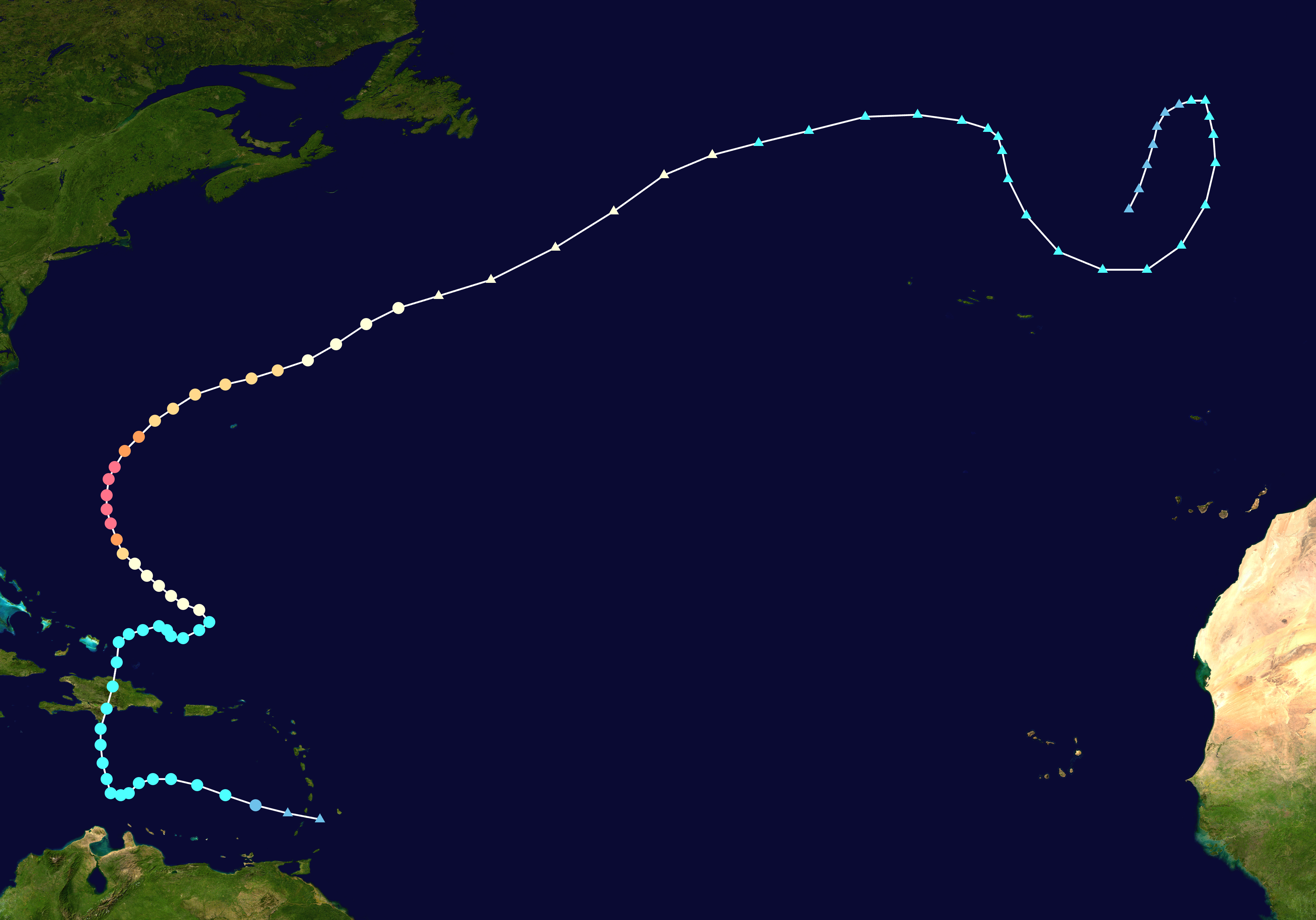
Map plotting the storm's track and intensity, according to the Saffir–Simpson scale Map key Saffir–Simpson scale Tropical depression (≤38 mph, ≤62 km/h) Tropical storm (39–73 mph, 63–118 km/h) Category 1 (74–95 mph, 119–153 km/h) Category 2 (96–110 mph, 154–177 km/h) Category 3 (111–129 mph, 178–208 km/h) Category 4 (130–156 mph, 209–251 km/h) Category 5 (≥157 mph, ≥252 km/h) Unknown Storm type Tropical cyclone Subtropical cyclone Extratropical cyclone, remnant low, tropical disturbance, or monsoon depression

In mid-August, a monsoon formed in the tropical Atlantic, which would go onto to form Franklin, Gert, and Emily in a short time span. Franklin was the westernmost of the three disturbances, located east-southeast of the Windward Islands. The NHC began monitoring the disturbance for development on August 17. An area of low pressure formed on August 19 east of the Leeward Islands, and after entering the Caribbean Sea on August 20, the disturbance organized into a tropical cyclone 170 miles (270 km) west of Saint Vincent. A subtropical ridge to the north of Franklin steered the tropical storm west-northwestward. Franklin continued organizing into August 21 when westerly wind shear began de-organizing the system. Around the same time, the storm began turning to the west then southwest. The degeneration was so severe that Franklin may have lacked a central circulation, and may have not been a tropical cyclone as a result, on August 22. A trough over the Southeastern United States allowed Franklin to turn northwestward by breaking the ridge. Early on August 23, Franklin turned northward and shear decreased, causing organization to improve. The storm soon made landfall on the Barahona Peninsula in Dominican Republic, at 10:00 UTC on August 23. Landfall intensity is uncertain due to a lack of measurements, but the NHC estimated Franklin as having 45 mph (72 km/h) winds and a central pressure of 1,003 millibars.

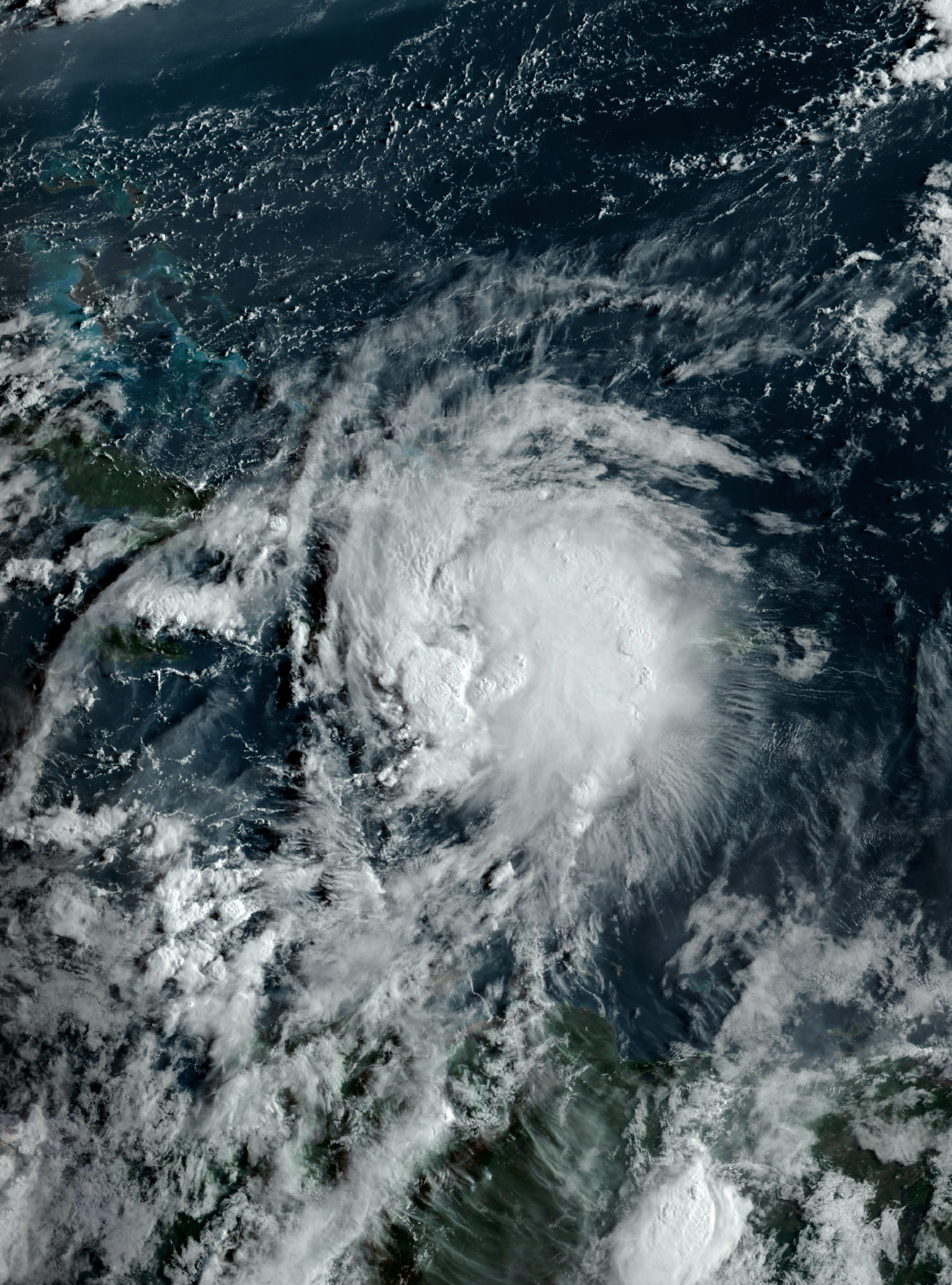
Franklin making landfall in the Dominican Republic on August 23

Weakening occurred after Franklin made landfall, and it crossed Hispaniola in about 12 hours, emerging in the Atlantic as a minimal tropical storm. The storm moved northwest. The trough that was over the Southeastern United States moved north of Franklin, causing westerly wind shear. The trough would also cause Franklin to move erratically to the east through August 25. On August 26, the trough split, one part allowing a ridge to develop that would cause Franklin to suddenly move to the northwest and intensify be removing wind shear. Franklin would become a hurricane by 12:00 UTC that day. A further decrease in wind shear along with less dry air allowed Franklin to begin to rapidly intensify as it moved northwestward, becoming the season's first major hurricane at 09:00 UTC on August 28. Franklin then began to intensify even more rapidly, becoming a Category 4 hurricane just over 2 1/2 hours later. Franklin then turned northward reached its peak intensity shortly afterwards with maximum sustained winds of 150 mph (240 km/h) and an estimated central pressure of 926 mbar (27.34 inHg) before initiating an eyewall replacement cycle, causing it to begin to slowly weaken as it turned northeastward. That trend continued after the cycle was completed as northerly wind shear from the outflow from Hurricane Idalia to the southwest increased over Franklin and by 09:00 UTC on August 30, it had weakened to Category 2 strength. The following day, while passing north of Bermuda, the wind shear over Franklin increased even further, causing the storm's eye to disappear as it became increasingly asymmetric and its forward speed to accelerate.

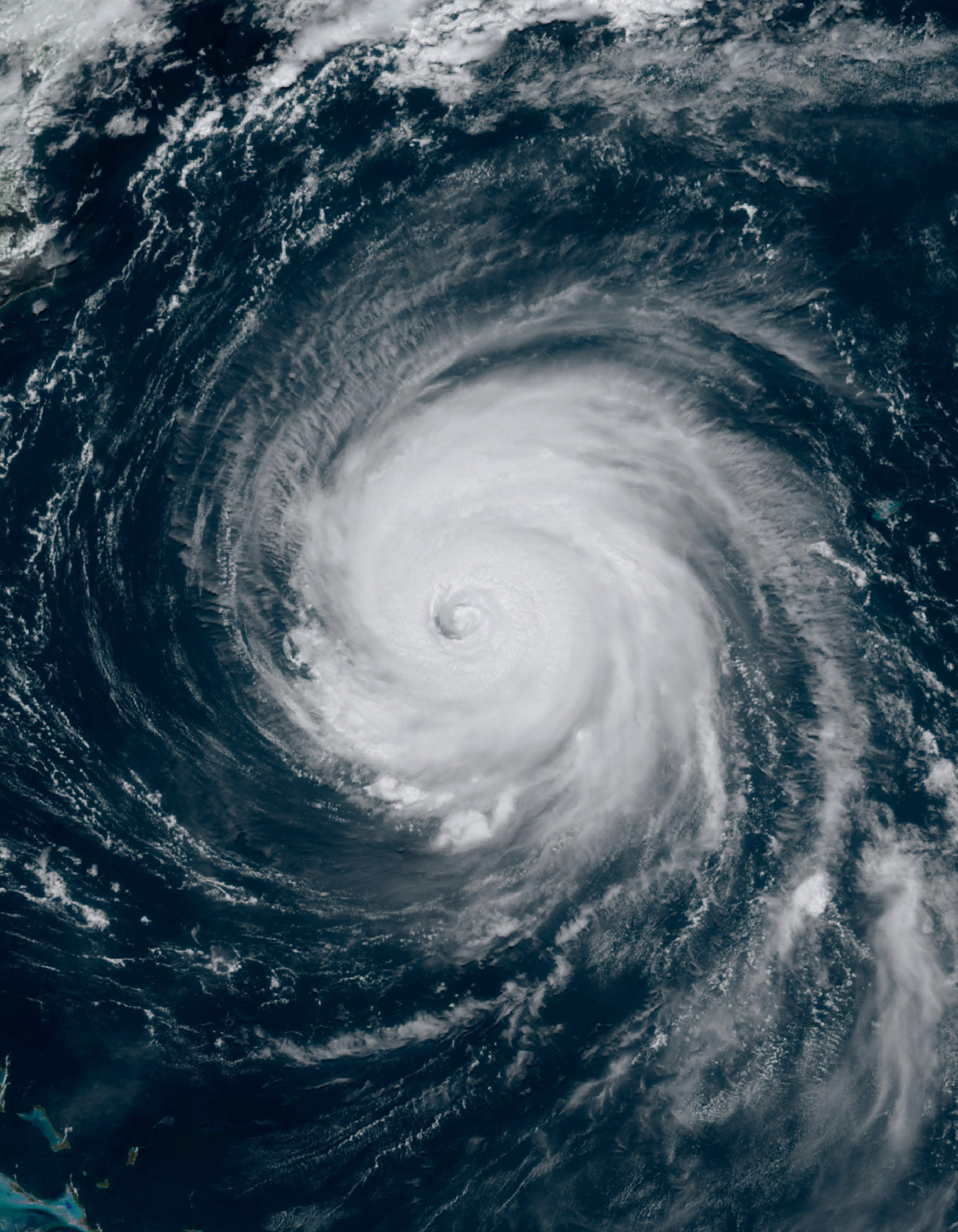
Franklin on August 29 after its eyewall replacement cycle, exhibiting a large eye

That same day, Franklin began losing its tropical characteristics, and by 21:00 UTC on September 1 it had become a hurricane-force extratropical cyclone. Shortly thereafter, the strong cyclone absorbed the smaller and weaker Tropical Storm Jose, which was situated to its east, following a brief Fujiwhara interaction. Afterward, the system accelerated towards the northeast. By September 4, it was located north of the Azores, then, it moved southeastward to near the northwestern coast of Spain three days later. As the system was moving over warmer waters at the time, the NHC began to monitor it again for possible redevelopment. Some reorganization did take place, but the system did not regenerate into a tropical or subtropical cyclone. The NHC stopped monitoring the post-tropical cyclone as it moved northward on September 7, and the remnant cyclone dissipated two days later.

== Preparations and impact ==
=== Dominican Republic ===
Rainfall map on Hispaniola.

Schools, governmental buildings, and airports were closed until August 24. In the Dominican Republic, more than 200 people were in shelters, and 24 of the 31 provinces in the country were under a red alert. Around 3,300 residents in low-lying areas were evacuated to higher grounds ahead of the storm. An additional 352 people were in government shelters.

Franklin brought heavy rainfall and wind, causing damage to buildings and homes, leaving numerous communities isolated. A peak wind gust of 50 mph (80 km/h) was recorded in Barahona. Nearly 350,000 homes were left without power and 1.6 million homes were cut off from potable water. Around 830,000 aqueduct users were affected after close to 120 aqueducts were put out of service. Santo Domingo recorded 330.7 mm (13.02 in) of rain from Franklin. Two people, including a teenager, were killed. A 15-year-old boy died after falling into the Rio Nigua, while another man was killed in San Cristóbal as he attempted to cross a ravine. Another man remains missing after he fell into a ravine in Santo Domingo Oeste. Preliminary agricultural damage was estimated to exceed RD$1 billion (US$17.6 million). Total damage reported the government amounted to RD$5.1 billion (US$90 million).

=== Haiti ===
The Haitian Civil Protection Agency warned residents of strong winds and rains expected as the storm made landfall. Haitian prime minister Ariel Henry urged residents to stock up on essential items such as food, water, and medications.

=== Bermuda ===
Several flights departing for Bermuda were cancelled. Franklin brought tropical-storm-force winds to the island's northern shores on August 30, causing scattered power outages to 300 residences. Several boat cruise routes that departed for Bermuda were affected due to Franklin.

=== Elsewhere ===
On August 30, Kathy Hochul, governor of New York, ordered swimming to be prohibited at Jones Beach State Park, Robert Moses State Park and Hither Hills State Park due to the risk of rip currents. The Town of Hempstead also shut down all beaches to swimming. The beaches reopened on September 1. Several beaches in New Jersey also closed to swimming, with one beach being completely closed.

== See also ==
- Weather of 2023
- Tropical cyclones in 2023
- Timeline of the 2023 Atlantic hurricane season
- List of Category 4 Atlantic hurricanes
- Other storms of the same name
- Hurricanes in Hispaniola
