= Balochistan (disambiguation) =

Balochistan, Baluchistan, or Baluchestan is a region that covers the southeastern region of the Persian Plateau, at the intersection of modern-day Pakistan, Iran, and Afghanistan.

Balochistan may also refer to one of several modern and historical territories within that region:

- Balochistan, Pakistan, a province of Pakistan
  - Baluchistan (Chief Commissioner's Province), a province of British India and a former province of Pakistan
  - Baluchistan Agency, for colonial indirect rule in the former tribal region of British India
  - Baluchistan States Union, a short-lived federation of princely states that formed a part of Pakistan
- Sistan and Baluchestan province, a province of Iran
- Balochistan, Afghanistan, a region in Afghanistan

== See also ==
- Al Balushi, Arabian diaspora
- Baluchestan-e Shutavar, a village in Iran
