= Balūchī, Sar-e Pol =

Balūchī
- Location in Afghanistan
- Coordinates: 36°21′12″N 66°55′02″E
- Country: Afghanistan
- Province: Sar-e Pol Province
- Time zone: + 4.30

Balūchī (also Balowchi) is a town in Sar-e Pol Province, Afghanistan.

== See also ==
- Sar-e Pol Province
