= Balūchī, Orūzgān =

Balūchī
- Location in Afghanistan
- Coordinates: 32°45′17″N 65°54′41″E
- Country: Afghanistan
- Province: Orūzgān Province
- Time zone: + 4.30

Balūchī (Persian: بلوچی; also Romanized as Baluchi, Blūči and Bluchi) is a town in Orūzgān Province, Afghanistan.

== See also ==
- Orūzgān Province
