= Balūchī, Herat =

Balūchī
- Location in Afghanistan
- Coordinates: 33°47′12″N 63°15′18″E
- Country: Afghanistan
- Province: Herat Province
- Time zone: + 4.30

Balūchī (also Baluchi and Balūči) is a town in Herat Province, Afghanistan.

== See also ==
- Herat Province
