= Balūchī, Helmand =

Town in Afghanistan

Balūchī Balūchī
- Location in Afghanistan
- Coordinates: 33°06′45″N 65°02′25″E
- Country: Afghanistan
- Province: Helmand Province
- Time zone: + 4.30

Balūchī (Pashto: بلوچی; also Romanized as Baluchi, and Balūči) is a town in Helmand Province, Afghanistan.

== See also ==
- Helmand Province
