= September 2023 New York floods =

2023 flood event in New York

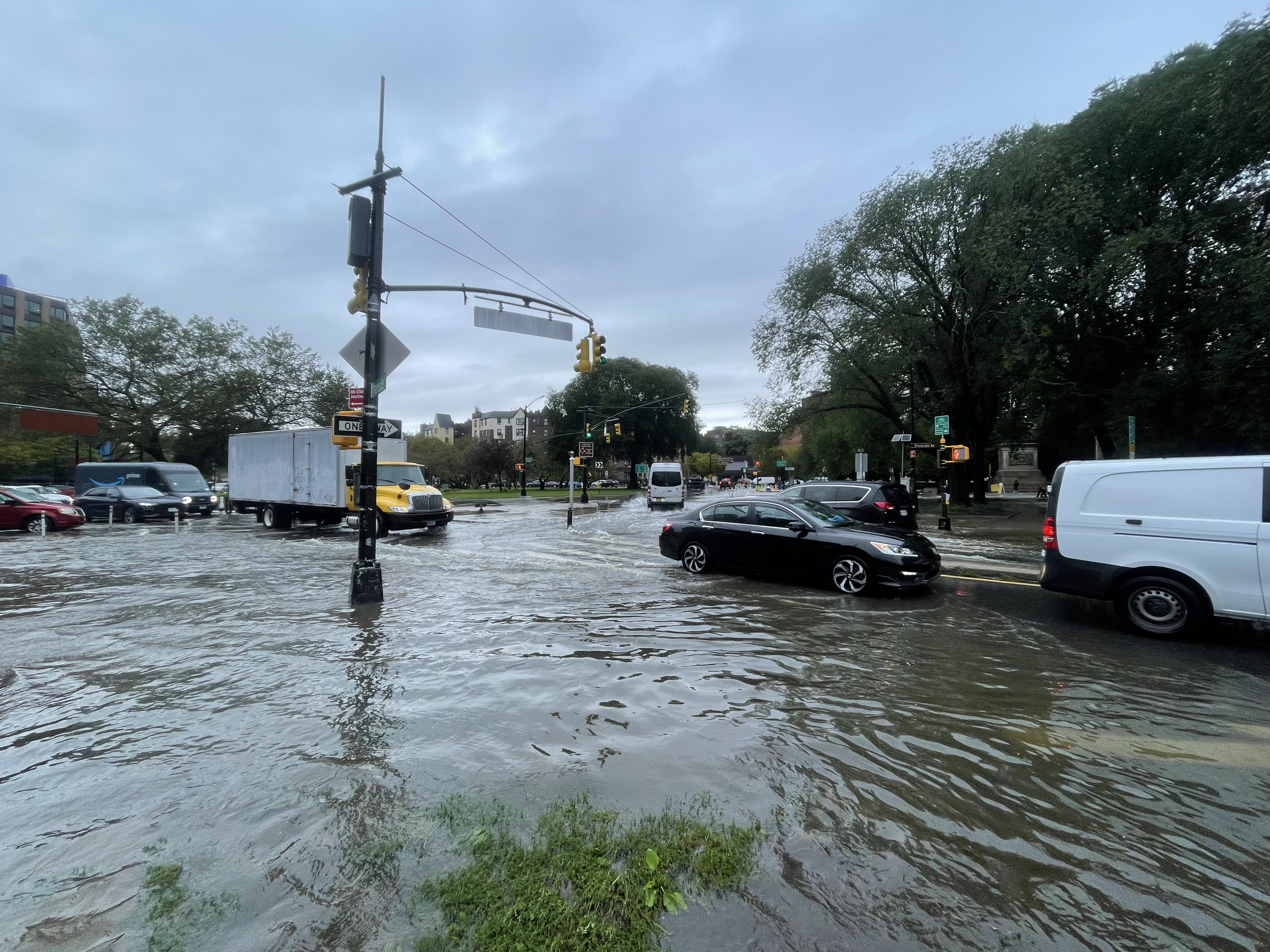
- Flash flooding across roadways in Flatbush, Brooklyn, New York
- Cause: Heavy rains

Meteorological history
- Duration: September 28–29, 2023

Flood
- Max. rainfall: 9.80 in (249 mm) in Park Slope, New York

Overall effects
- Fatalities: 0
- Damage: $100 million (2023 USD)
- Areas affected: Southeastern New York, Southwestern Connecticut, Northeastern New Jersey

On September 29, 2023, heavy rainfall led to flooding across portions of the New York metropolitan area and surrounding areas in the United States. The floods were caused by a low-pressure area that had absorbed the remnants of Tropical Storm Ophelia, which then stalled over the New York City area. Multiple rounds of heavy rainfall also moved through the region as a result of favorable precipitable water values, convective instability, and low-level winds. This induced high rainfall totals across northwestern New Jersey, southeastern New York, and southwestern Connecticut, with the highest total reaching 9.80 inches (249 mm) in Park Slope, Brooklyn.

The flooding inundated numerous highways and roads, and affecting all New York City Subway service, suspending and delaying routes and services. Additionally, Amtrak, Metro-North Railroad, and NYC Ferry services were delayed or suspended, and airports across the New York City area experienced service disruptions and flight delays and cancellations, including both a terminal being flooded and a ground stop implemented at LaGuardia Airport. Several attractions, including the Alamo Drafthouse in three locations and the Prospect Park Zoo, were closed as a result of the flooding. Heavy rainfall inundated schools and forced multiple festivals to be postponed across the affected areas. Flooding also occurred across numerous towns and municipalities across New Jersey and Connecticut, causing the Housatonic River to swell in western portions of the latter state.

In the aftermath of the flooding, New York governor Kathy Hochul declared a state of emergency for the five boroughs of New York City, as well as portions of the Hudson Valley and Long Island. New York City mayor Eric Adams and Hoboken, New Jersey mayor Ravinder Bhalla also declared states of emergency, while New Jersey governor Phil Murphy declared a state of emergency for all 21 counties in the state. Damage from the floods were estimated at $100 million.

== Meteorological synopsis ==
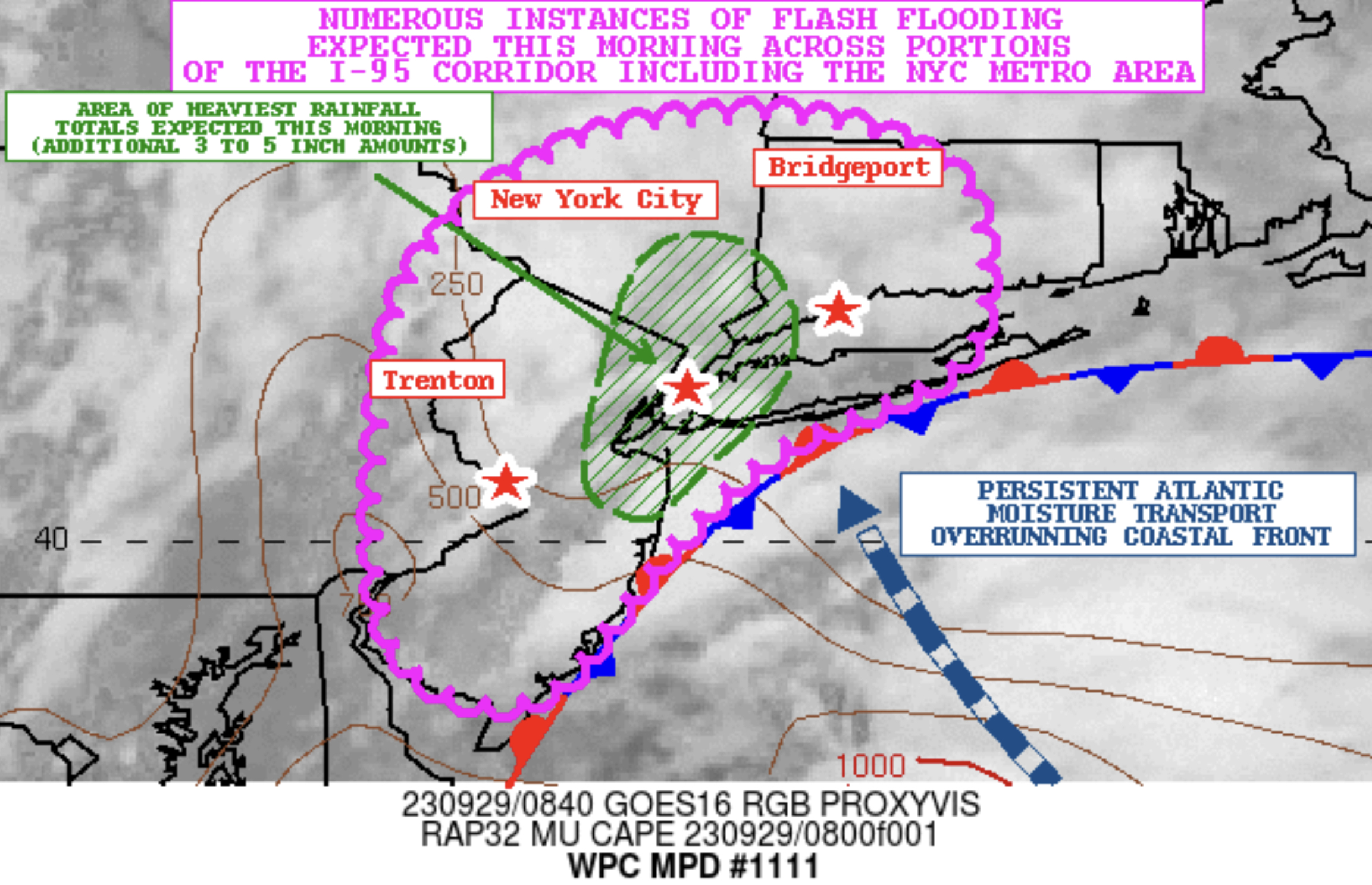
A mesoscale discussion from the Weather Prediction Center showing the expectation of flash floods across New York City

A weak low-pressure area developed off the East Coast of the United States, absorbing the remnants of Tropical Storm Ophelia on September 29. The low then became attached to a jet stream and stalled over the New York City area, producing heavy rainfall across already-saturated areas. The heavy rainfall occurred after convection developed on the morning of September 29, after the weak low became an upper-level trough, which interacted with a strengthening cold front from the Ohio Valley moving offshore in the Atlantic Ocean.

Widespread heavy rainfall occurred in a concentrated area from the New York metropolitan area to southern New York to southern Connecticut to western Massachusetts along a low-level convergence axis. Favorable precipitable water values, elevated convective instability, and southeasterly low-level winds supported several rounds of heavy rain across the concentrated area. The mesoscale low-pressure area then moved east on the afternoon of September 29, where the convergence axis and elevated instability again produced heavy rainfall, this time across Long Island, and weak instability values and moisture transport also contributed to rainfall rates of 1–2 inches (25–51 mm) per hour across southern Connecticut and western Massachusetts.

== Preparations and impact ==
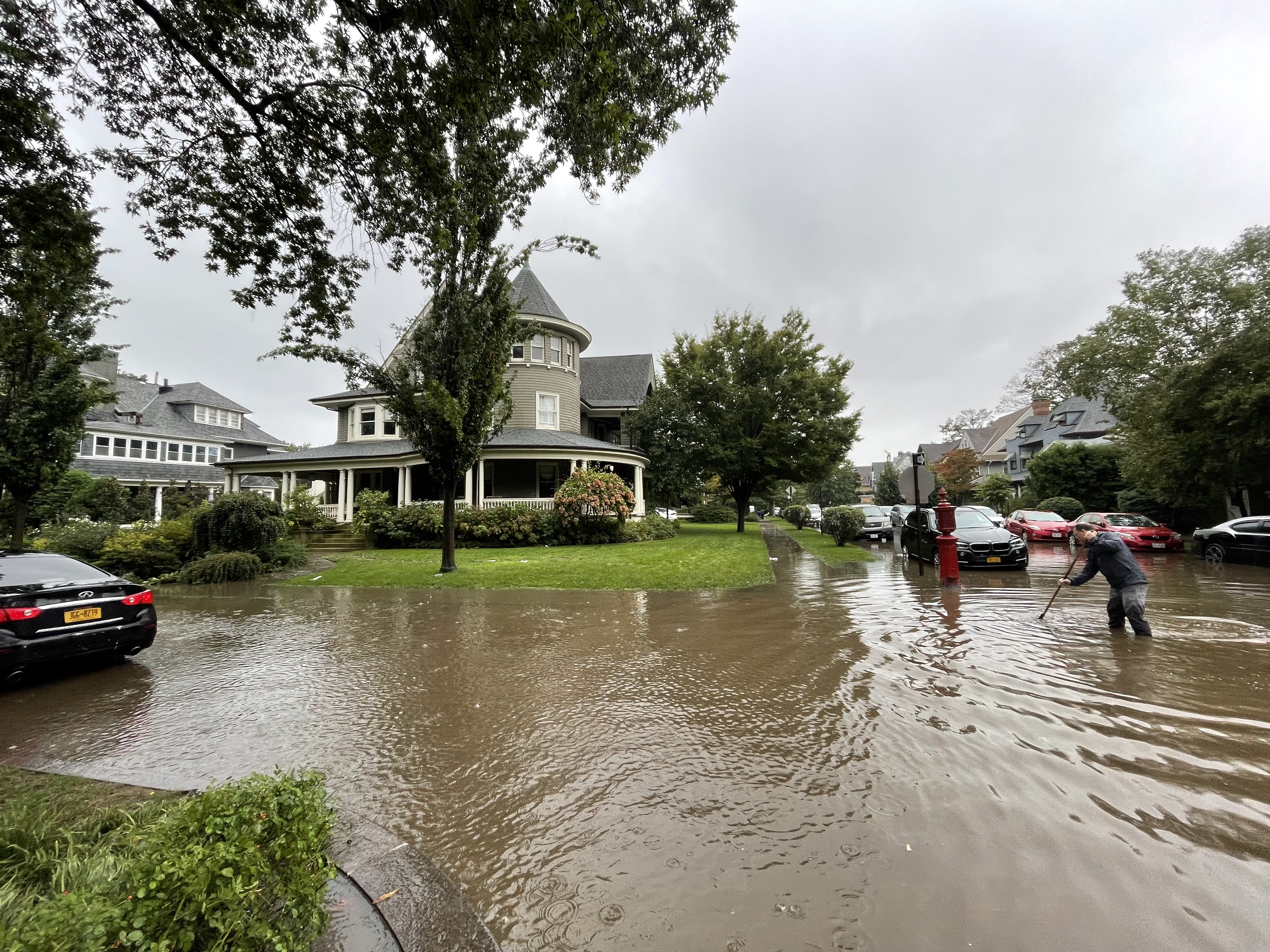
Flooding in Flatbush, Brooklyn, New York on September 29

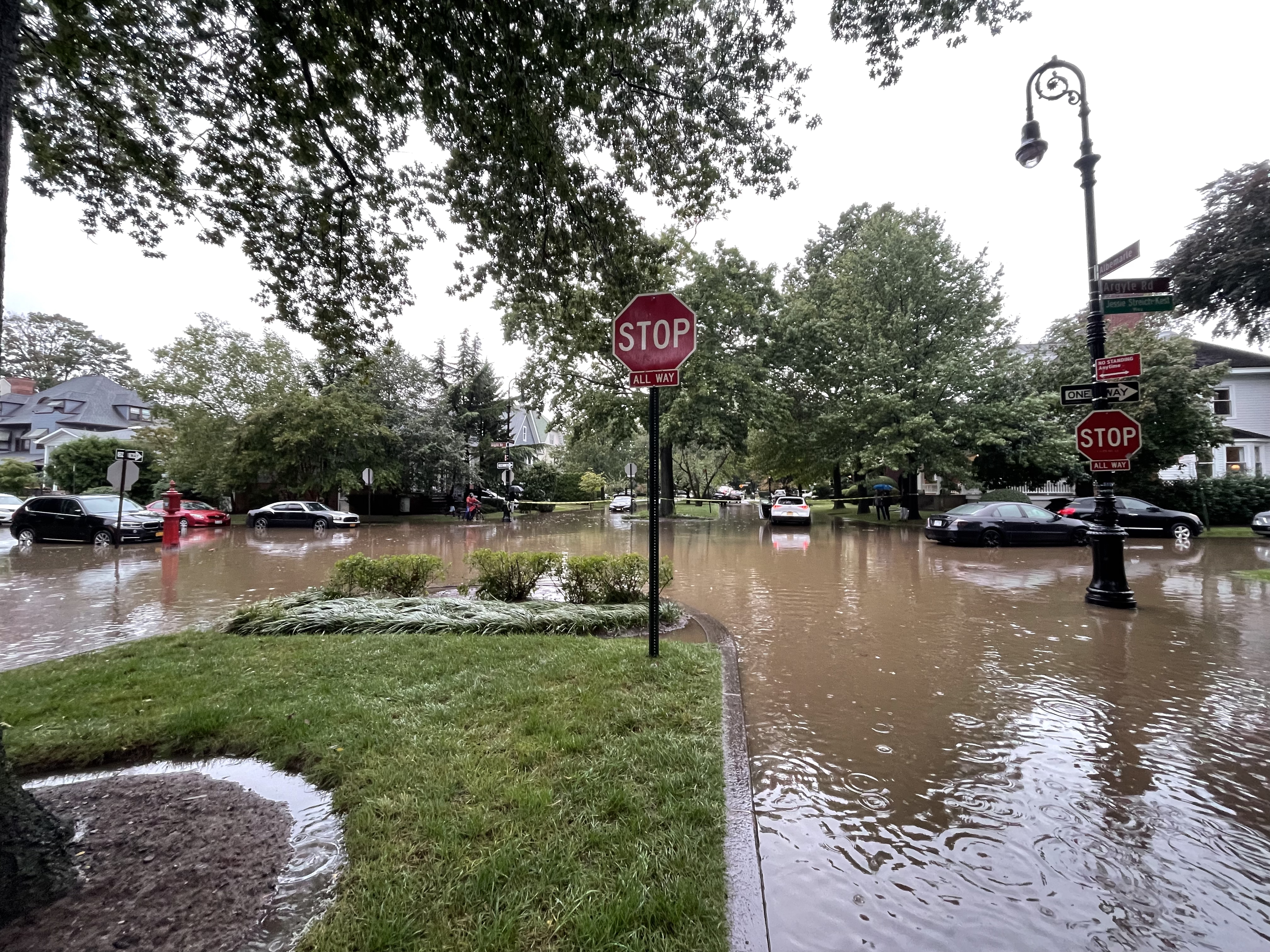
A flooded intersection in Flatbush, Brooklyn

A flood watch was issued for portions of New York, Connecticut, and New Jersey, while moderate risk of excessive rainfall was issued by the Weather Prediction Center on September 28, which was maintained through the next day.

Numerous locations across received more than 4 inches (100 mm) of rain in New York, with the highest total being recorded in Park Slope, where 9.80 inches (249 mm) of rain fell. Central Park received 5.48 inches (139 mm) of rainfall, Midtown Manhattan recording 6.09 inches (155 mm) of rain, 6.19 inches (157 mm) of rain fell in Fordham, and Howard Beach received 7.86 inches (200 mm) of rainfall. The rainfall in Central Park was the sixth-highest rainfall over 141 years. In Brooklyn, Gowanus received 9.06 inches (230 mm) of rainfall, and parts of the borough received 4.5 in (110 mm) of rain in just three hours. The National Weather Service in New York City issued a considerable flash flood warning for Manhattan, Brooklyn, and Queens as heavy rain fell throughout the region. Additionally, flood warnings covered more than 18 million people across the New York metropolitan area. From the floodwaters, 28 people were rescued, including six from flooded apartment basements. The floods contributed to the wettest September in New York City since 1882, with 14.25 in (362 mm) of rainfall that month; both LaGuardia Airport and John F. Kennedy International Airport had their wettest Septembers on record.

Several highways, including all of Playland Parkway, and portions of the FDR Drive, Hutchinson River Parkway, Major Deegan Expressway (I-87), Brooklyn Queens Expressway (I-278), Cross Island Parkway, Belt Parkway, and Grand Central Parkway, were closed. Traffic was stopped on the Prospect Expressway (NY 27) near Kensington as vehicles were inundated by floodwaters.

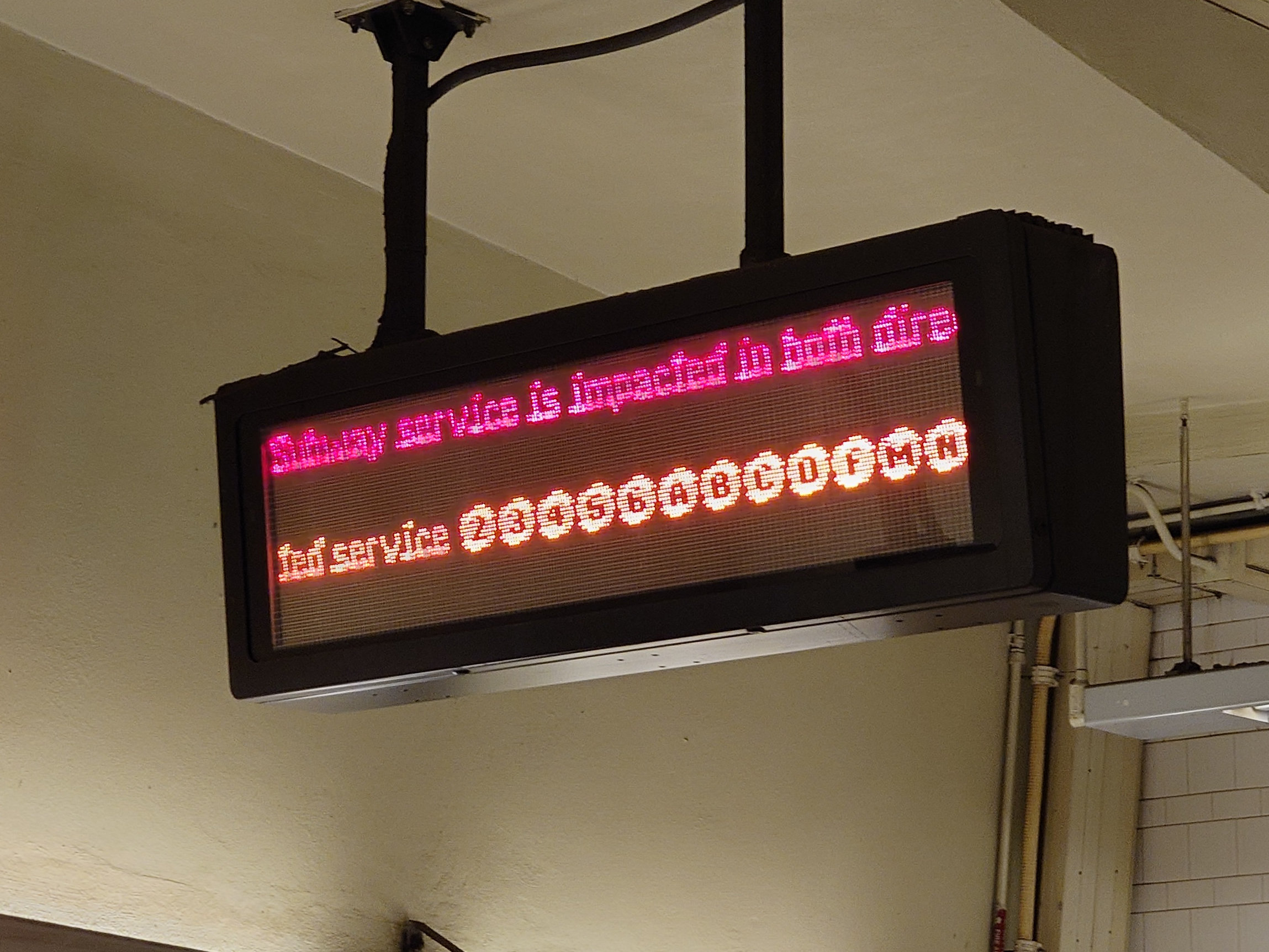
An information screen on the subway listing affected services

Every New York City Subway service was affected, with four routes completely suspended, 12 partially suspended, and an additional eight services significantly delayed. There was no train service on the 2, 3, 4, 5 routes in Brooklyn, and no service on the B and G routes at all. Metro-North Railroad service was suspended on the New Haven, Hudson and Harlem lines, and the Long Island Rail Road experienced suspensions on the Far Rockaway Branch and Long Beach Branch. A terminal at LaGuardia Airport was shut down due to flooding, while a ground stop was imposed at the airport. Departures were delayed at John F. Kennedy International Airport due to heavy rainfall, with total rainfall of 8.65 inches (220 mm), which set the highest September rainfall total in a 24-hour period since Hurricane Donna. NYC Ferry and Amtrak service was also delayed.

Minor roof collapses and flooded basements occurred across the region, including one basement of which was flooded again, after it was previously flooded during the effects of Hurricane Ida in the Northeastern United States. A Major League Baseball game between the New York Mets and the Philadelphia Phillies at Citi Field in Queens was postponed, and a separate Mets game against the Miami Marlins was suspended in the ninth inning due to rain. That game was later declared a Mets victory. A National Hockey League preseason game between the New York Rangers and New York Islanders at UBS Arena was postponed. Schools across the Bronxville Union Free School District were let out early due to the heavy rainfall that fell across portions of Bronxville and Westchester County, and an elementary school in Brooklyn was evacuated due to a boiler smoking possibly related to the flooding. More than 150 schools across New York were inundated by floodwaters, and more than 105 school buses were delayed, which affected more than 250 schools. The Alamo Drafthouse in Brooklyn, Manhattan and Staten Island was also closed. Several attractions were closed, including Wildlife Conservation Society zoos; a female sea lion also briefly escaped from its enclosure in the Central Park Zoo. Across the New York City metropolitan area, damages were estimated at $100 million by Aon Benfield.

Outside New York, sewers and roads were overwhelmed by flooding in Hoboken, New Jersey, and mayor Ravinder Bhalla declared a state of emergency. Later, New Jersey governor Phil Murphy declared a state of emergency for all 21 counties in the state and ordered all state offices to close. New Jersey routes 35 in Point Pleasant Beach and Wall Township and 71 in Manasquan were closed due to flooding, in addition to numerous roads being closed. Additionally, a road northeast of Ramsey was inundated with at least 1 foot (300 mm) of floodwaters. The heaviest rain fell in Asbury Park, where 9 inches (230 mm) of rain fell. Reported flooding occurred in Belmar, Deal, and Spring Lake Heights.

In Connecticut, heavy rainfall forced closures on numerous roads, including a sinkhole on U.S. Route 202 in New Milford and flooding on Connecticut Route 199 in Washington. Several festivals were postponed, and multiple flood warnings were issued by the National Weather Service. The Housatonic River swelled in western portions of the state, and damage occurred across several towns in the state, including in New Hartford, Norwalk, and Torrington. In Hartford, 4.07 inches (103 mm) of rain fell, which was the highest total across Connecticut and setting a daily rainfall record.

Nearly 300 flights were cancelled and 400 were delayed at LaGuardia Airport, while 200 flights were cancelled and more than 400 were delayed at John F. Kennedy International Airport. Additionally, nine flights were cancelled and more than 300 were delayed at Newark Liberty International Airport in New Jersey.

== Aftermath ==
Following the floods, New York governor Kathy Hochul declared a state of emergency for the five boroughs of New York City, as well as parts of the Hudson Valley and Long Island. New York City mayor Eric Adams declared a state of emergency for the city. The New York Army National Guard was deployed. The Prospect Park Zoo was closed, after the zoo's basements were inundated with up to 25 feet (300 in) of floodwaters and damage totaling in the "millions", and did not reopen until May 24, 2024. Electrical damage sustained from the heavy rains forced 116 patients to be evacuated and a temporary closure of Woodhull Medical Center. On January 31, 2024, United States president Joe Biden approved a disaster declaration first requested on November 29, 2023, primarily for the New York City area, resulting in financial aid from the Federal Emergency Management Agency to be spent on infrastructure repairs stemming from the floods. Crystal Hudson, a city council member of Brooklyn, expressed concern that New York City "wasn't really prepared" for the flooding. The floods prompted New York City comptroller Brad Lander to create an investigation into the management of heavy rainfall in the city, which was supported by mayor Adams.

== See also ==
- Floods in the United States (2000–present)
- Hurricane Ida
