= Heart of Brooklyn =

Nonprofit organization (2001–2013)

Heart of Brooklyn (HOB) was a non-profit organization active from 2001-2013 led by six cultural institutions located near Grand Army Plaza in central Brooklyn, New York City. The partnership consisted of Brooklyn Botanic Garden, Brooklyn Children's Museum, Brooklyn Museum, Brooklyn Public Library, Prospect Park and Prospect Park Zoo.

== History ==
Seeking a way in which to encourage visitors to Manhattan to see New York City's other four boroughs, the six organizations came together to promote Brooklyn as a cultural destination. Although it was officially founded in 2001, the organizations had been working together on an unofficial level since 1998 with the launching of the program's summer camp, called Brooklyn Cultural Adventures Program or BCAP. Through the formal partnership established in 2001 and launched on Valentine's Day in 2002, the group was able to expand its offerings and better pool its resources. The group ceased operations on Valentine's Day 2013, although BCAP was continued.

== Activities ==
HOB ran the Brooklyn Cultural Adventures Program (BCAP), a program and summer camp based at HOB's member institutions. The camp is designed to engage children in cultural activities during the summer as well as introduce them to the organizations and their collections thereby attracting a new generation of cultural consumers.

Heart of Brooklyn's goal was to make its organizations more visible and accessible. The partnership ran a free shuttle service called The HOB Connection, announced in November 2008, which delivers passengers to its cultural institutions. The service was designed to help tourists in Manhattan and residents of Brooklyn reach the cultural hub surrounding Prospect Park.

HOB also worked with local merchants and community leaders on neighborhood revitalization efforts, having been selected as a Core Provider for Avenue NYC as well as participating in the NYC Clean Streets program. HOB was a member of and active participant in the Washington Avenue-Prospect Heights Merchants Association.

In addition, HOB's collaboration with Brooklyn Borough Hall produced tourism initiatives geared toward marketing the borough as a whole, such as Brooklyn Pass. The Pass includes free or reduced admission to participating organizations as well as discounts at other venues throughout the Borough.

HOB published a monthly newsletter entitled Heartbeat, and in May 2009, published the Extraordinary Places in the Heart of Brooklyn coupon booklet in cooperation with neighborhood shops and businesses.

== Awards and recognition ==
In 2008, Heart of Brooklyn, in conjunction with American Express and Commerce Bank, was awarded an Encore Award by the Arts & Business Council of New York. The award recognized the efforts of these institutions to link local economic and cultural activities, most notably through Heart of Brooklyn and American Express’ Keep It Local campaign.

On July 13, 2009, HOB was presented with a 2009 Neighborhood Achievement Award presented by the Mayor and New York City Department of Small Business Services, in recognition of its efforts in the neighborhood of Prospect Heights.

Heart of Brooklyn’s BCAP program was selected as a 2009 Coming Up Taller semifinalist by the President's Committee on the Arts and Humanities.

== See also ==
- Brooklyn Cultural District
