= Prospect Park Zoo =

Zoo in Brooklyn, New York

- Prospect Park Zoo logo

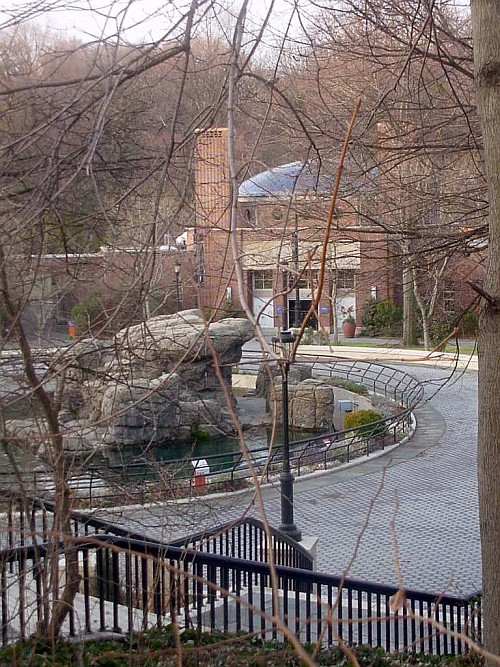
- Interactive map of Prospect Park Zoo
- 40°39′57″N 73°57′52″W
- Date opened: 1890 (a menagerie); July 3, 1935 (city zoo); October 5, 1993 (wildlife conservation center)
- Location: 450 Flatbush Avenue, Brooklyn, New York, United States 11225, in Prospect Park
- Land area: 12 acres (4.9 ha)
- No. of animals: 864 (2016)
- No. of species: 176 (2016)
- Memberships: AZA
- Public transit: New York City Subway: trains at Prospect Park; New York City Bus: B16, B41, B43, B48
- Website: www.prospectparkzoo.com

The Prospect Park Zoo is a 12-acre (4.9 ha) zoo located off Flatbush Avenue on the eastern side of Prospect Park, Brooklyn, New York City. As of 2016, the zoo houses 864 animals representing about 176 species, and as of 2007, it averaged 300,000 visitors annually. The Prospect Park Zoo is operated by the Wildlife Conservation Society (WCS). In conjunction with the Prospect Park Zoo's operations, the WCS offers children's educational programs, is engaged in restoration of endangered species populations, runs a wildlife theater, and reaches out to the local community through volunteer programs.

Its precursor, the Menagerie, opened in 1890. The present facility first opened as a city zoo on July 3, 1935, and was part of a larger revitalization program of city parks, playgrounds and zoos initiated in 1934 by Parks Commissioner Robert Moses. It was built, in large part, through Civil Works Administration and Works Progress Administration (WPA) labor and funding.

After 53 years of operation as a city zoo run by the New York City Department of Parks and Recreation, Prospect Park Zoo, also colloquially known as "Brooklyn Zoo", closed in June 1988 for reconstruction. The closure signaled the start of a five-year, $37 million renovation program that, save for the exteriors of the 1930s-era buildings, completely replaced the zoo. It was rededicated on October 5, 1993, as the Prospect Park Wildlife Conservation Center, as part of a system of four zoos and one aquarium managed by the WCS, (Note: The others are the Bronx Zoo, Central Park Zoo, Queens Zoo, and New York Aquarium.) all of which are accredited by the Association of Zoos and Aquariums (AZA).

== Features ==
Map of notable buildings and structures at Prospect Park (note: not all entrances shown). Click on points for more details.

The Prospect Park Zoo is part of the Wildlife Conservation Society, an integrated network of four zoos and an aquarium spread throughout New York City. Located at 450 Flatbush Avenue, across from the Brooklyn Botanic Garden, the zoo is situated on a 12-acre (4.9 ha) plot somewhat lower than street level in Prospect Park. Visitors may enter through the Flatbush Avenue entrance or from within Prospect Park, near Leffert's Homestead and the Carousel.

=== Educational programs ===
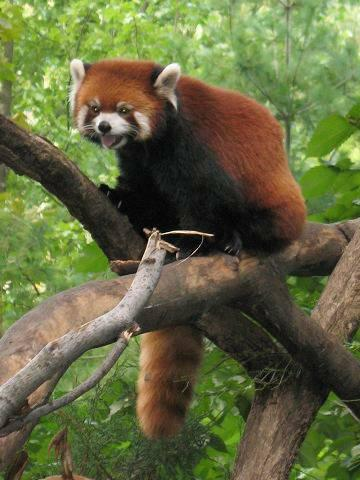
A red panda at the Prospect Park Zoo

The zoo hosts educational venues as well as exhibits. These revolve around the Discovery Center, a building with classrooms and laboratories designed to introduce school-age children to investigative practices of environmental and wildlife scientists. The Discovery Center introduces children to laboratory practices; they learn about and use professional laboratory equipment and learn how to integrate what they observe into zoological theory. These programs are based on educational concepts developed through WIZE (Wildlife Inquiry through Zoo Education), a program developed by Bronx Zoo educators.

=== Facilities ===
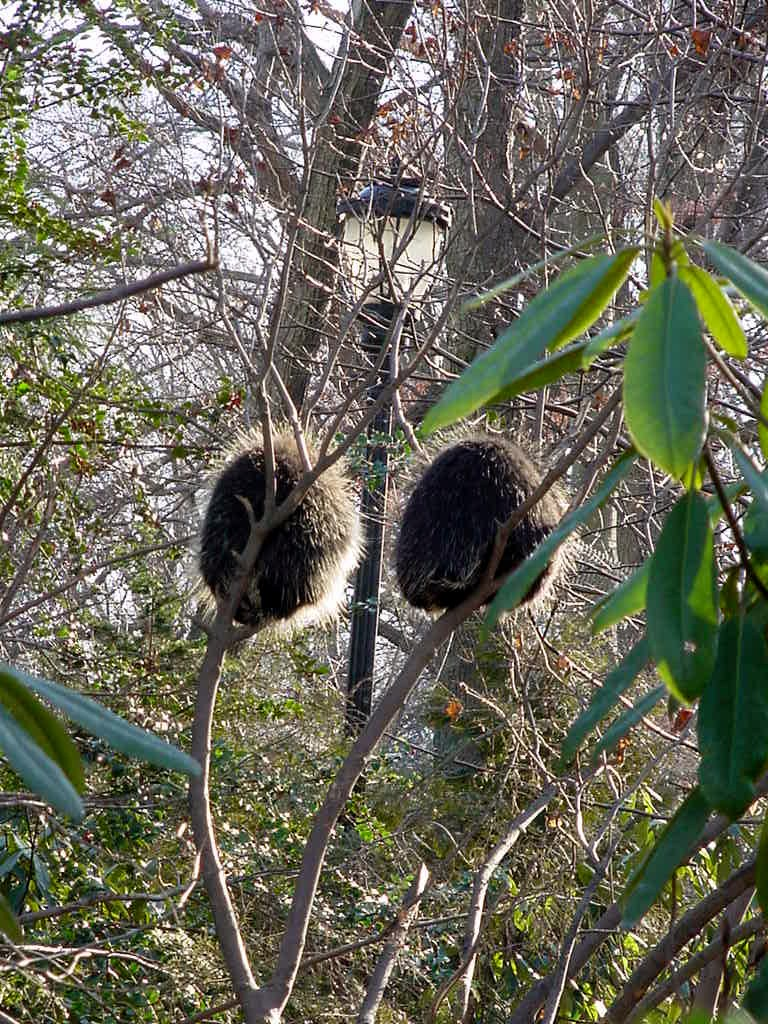
A pair of North American porcupines in a tree. Discovery Trail exhibit at the Prospect Zoo

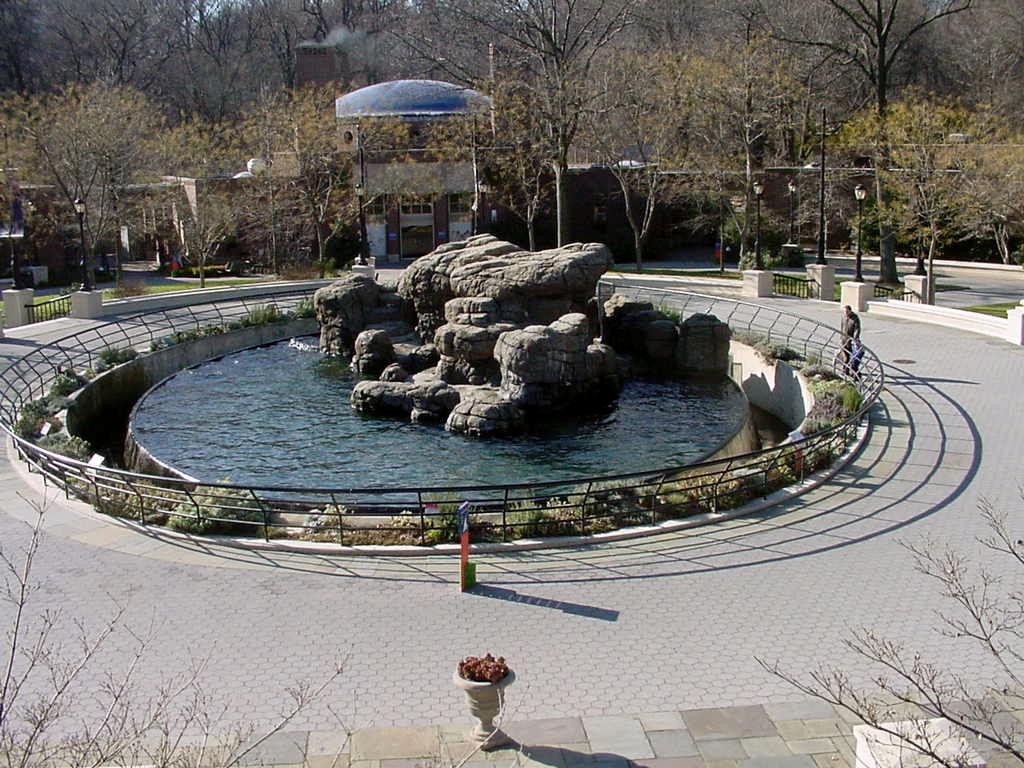
The Sea Lion Pool in the center court of Prospect Park Zoo

The zoo grounds and building exteriors were designed by Aymar Embury II. The facility consists of six red brick and lime-stoned trimmed buildings grouped in a semi-circular arrangement around a central courtyard with the sea lion pool occupying the center of the court. The building exteriors date to the 1930s while the interiors were built during the 1989–1993 reconstruction. There is a freestanding wooden barn just north of the circular group of buildings. A set of stairs from the main entrance leads visitors down to zoo level. A small restaurant and the administrative center is immediately to the left, occupying the southeastern quadrant of the zoo. The Discovery Center is immediately to the right, occupying the northeastern quadrant of the zoo. Arrayed in front of the visitor are the three exhibit buildings, The Discovery trail to the south, the Animal Lifestyles building, behind the sea lion pool directly in front of the visitor, Hall of Animals is to the right.

== History ==
=== First menagerie ===
The original 1866 proposal of Prospect Park featured a "Zoological Garden" on the western flank of the park, near the present Litchfield Villa, but the garden had not been started by the time Frederick Law Olmsted and Calvert Vaux separated from the park in 1874. This notwithstanding, a few features of the original park design did serve zoological purposes. A Wild Fowl Pond, once occupying the northern quadrant of the zoo grounds, served as a haven for water birds. A Deer Paddock, once occupying the southern quadrants of the zoo grounds, was a penned-in area for deer. In addition, a flock of sheep regularly maintained the grass in the park meadows and were kept in a paddock on the eastern flank of Sullivan Hill, near the now-demolished Dairy Farmhouse.

Interest in zoological gardens flowered in the last decade of the 19th century. An informal Menagerie began to take shape within Prospect Park in May 1890 when the newly appointed president of the City of Brooklyn Parks Commission, George V. Brower, donated "three young cinnamon bears." State Treasurer Harry Adams followed with a donation of three white deer, establishing a pattern. It was mainly through donations of animals by rich or prominent individuals that the Menagerie grew. By 1893, one observer noted that “seven seals arrived, one buffalo, from the estate of Samuel B. Duryea, three red foxes, three bears, one sacred cow, two white deer, five red deer, seven seals, and twelve to fifteen peacocks."

The animals were kept in pens on Sullivan Hill, situated across the East Drive from the zoo's present location, near the sheep paddock and northeast of the Dairy Farmhouse. Of the original zoological facilities in the park, the Deer Paddock, located near the present Carousel, was converted into a meadow and the deer were moved to the new Menagerie, The Wild Fowl Pond remained, located on the east side of the park in a low area now forming the northern part of the zoo. The Menagerie continued to accrue animals in the first decades of the 20th century. These were generally donated by prominent individuals and institutions and formed a varied collection of specimens both native to North America and other regions of the world. A two-story brick building was opened in the Menagerie in 1916, housing monkeys, some small mammals, and several birds. An elephant house in the zoo was announced in 1930, and a heating system was proposed for the elephant house in 1932.

=== Modern zoo creation ===
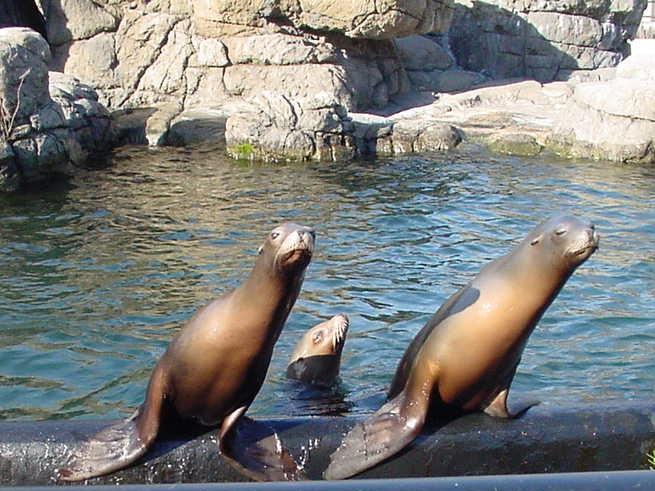
The California sea lions as feeding time approaches

After assuming office in January 1934, New York City mayor Fiorello La Guardia hired Robert Moses to head a newly unified Parks Department. Moses soon prepared extensive plans to reconstruct the city's parks, renovate existing facilities and create new swimming pools, zoos, playgrounds and parks. Moses acquired substantial Civil Works Administration, and later, Works Progress Administration funding and soon embarked upon an eight-year citywide construction program, relieving some of the high unemployment in New York City in this Depression year. Aymar Embury II prepared plans for the new zoo, which were announced in March 1934. The new zoo was to be located between the Wild Fowl Pond and former Deer Paddock on the east side of the park, across the East Drive from the Menagerie and slightly north of Willink Plaza and the Lefferts Historic House. Work on preliminary excavations had already started when Embury's plans were officially announced.

Embury designed a half circle of six brick buildings centered on a seal pool. Built of red brick with limestone trim, the buildings featured bas-relief scenes from Rudyard Kipling's The Jungle Book. Five sculptors executed a total of thirteen such scenes, not only on the front and back walls of zoo buildings, but also on all four sides of both brick entrance shelters at Flatbush Avenue. However, the positioning of some of the bas-reliefs makes them less accessible than others. The buildings constituted an integrated facility and were seen as a great improvement over the somewhat haphazardly developed Menagerie. The zoo featured an extensive bear pit, a seal pool, a lion's house (the current Animals in our Lives building) an elephant's house (the current Animal Lifestyles building), and a house for monkeys, birds, and horned animals (now the World of Animals building). These structures were to be accessed by a grand stair on Flatbush Avenue. In late 1934, the Brooklyn Daily Eagle reported that the zoo was to be completed the next March.

New York governor Al Smith was tasked with finding animals for the new exhibits in May 1935, and zoo officials began raising $50,000 that month to acquire animals. Samuel Klein of department store S. Klein provided $5,000 to buy animals for 25 cages, and Smith requested animals from states such as Vermont, Connecticut, and Virginia. Animals began arriving at the zoo at the end of June 1935. The new Prospect Park Zoo was dedicated on July 3, 1935, and received 150,000 visitors on its first day. Only three of the five planned structures were completed at that time. Moses and La Guardia, who had missed the zoo's official opening, toured the facility later that month. Tens of thousands of local children suggested names for the zoo's animals, who were formally given monikers at a ceremony in September 1935. Upon the new zoo's completion, the Dairy Farmhouse, sheep paddock, and Menagerie were demolished, and the sheep flock in Prospect Park were supplanted by mechanical mowers.

=== Mid- and late 20th century ===
From the 1930s to the 1980s, the zoo showcased large animals from faraway places. An estimated one million people visited the Prospect Park Zoo annually prior to World War II, but attendance gradually declined, reaching about a half million by the early 1980s.

==== Early years ====
In its first few months of operation, the zoo recorded an average of 100,000 daily visitors. The zoo initially had 131 animals and 56 birds and recorded two million visitors in its first ten months. Within two years of the zoo's opening, numerous animals joined the collection, such as elephants, a buck and doe, a boa constrictor, anteaters, and lizards. In addition, some animals were bred in the zoo, such as a brown bear, leopards, and several litters of lions. The zoo had 125,000 weekly visitors by mid-1937, some of whom went too close to the animals' cages or exhibits, prompting police to patrol the zoo. Zoo officials announced in 1939 that they would build a ramp around the elephant enclosure, following separate incidents in which one elephant was killed and another was injured. Officials also announced plans to reinforce the walls of the kangaroo enclosure after a kangaroo escaped into the streets of Brooklyn. Ronald Cheyne-Stout, who had been appointed as the zoo's director when it reopened, was removed from his position in 1939.

The number of animals in the zoo increased through the 1940s, and officials held competitions where children named the new animals. In addition, Works Progress Administration laborers built a 60-by-30-foot (18.3 by 9.1 m) hay barn in the zoo in 1940. Visitors frequently tossed items into the zoo's enclosures, which killed many of the animals by 1943, including one elephant, 45 monkeys, and all of the zoo's seals. As a result, the police began strictly enforcing a rule banning patrons from feeding animals. In 1948, the city government provided $10,000 to purchase additional animals for the Central Park and Prospect Park zoos. Several animals were also born at the zoo in the late 1940s and the 1950s, such as a zebra, bear cubs, a llama, and a hippo. Zoo officials also expanded the collection by buying animals such as elephants. The U.S. government gave $615,000 for the restoration of the Prospect Park Zoo and other parts of the park in 1966. Many of the zoo's cages were widened in the late 1960s.

==== Decline ====
As early as 1967, zoo superintendent Ronald Ellis said the animals were so frequently abused that all of the animals had to be moved indoors at night. At the time, anyone could walk into the zoo from the street. In response to a 1967 report in the New York Daily News, the city doubled the number of security guards at the zoo at night. Writing in New York magazine in late 1970, writer Erik Sanberg-Diment termed the zoo the 'rattiest' in New York – "in the literal sense of the word. (I've never been there without seeing several rodents romping in the bear lair)." He reported that one of the zoo's earliest residents, a Southern United States black vulture, "…is still there, looking down his beak at visitors littering the walks, and celebrating his 35th anniversary in the same old cage."

During the 1970s, there were multiple incidents involving animal injuries or deaths. This included the scalding death of a monkey in 1975, allegedly by a zoo employee, as well as an acting zoo director who was accused of shooting at pigeons and killing zoo animals. A zoo employee also locked himself in a monkey enclosure for several hours in 1974 to protest conditions at the zoo. These incidents, as well as several others at the Central Park Zoo, prompted protests by animal-rights groups who wanted to close the two zoos and move the animals to the larger Bronx Zoo. The administration of mayor Ed Koch and the New York Zoological Society (renamed the Wildlife Conservation Society, or WCS, in 1993) signed a fifty-year agreement in April 1980, wherein the Central Park, Prospect Park, and Queens Zoos would be administered by the Society.

By the 1980s, a New York Times reporter quoted a zoo supervisor as saying: "Vandalism is a major problem, and deterioration is overtaking repairs." According to the supervisor, one of the zoo's bears frequently had bloodied feet because of all the litter in the zoo. Activists were pressing for major renovations of the zoo, which, in 1983, was rated by the Humane Society of the United States as one of the "10 worst" zoos in the country. Others felt that a zoo was not in keeping with the original design of Prospect Park and urged its complete removal from the grounds. The May 1987 mauling death of Juan Perez, an 11-year-old boy scaling the fence to the polar bear pit, underscored the difficulties with the fifty-year-old facility. By late summer 1987, an $18-million, 2.5-year renovation plan was put forth to renovate Prospect Park Zoo and coordinate its venue with other facilities to avoid redundant programming. Prospect Park Zoo was slated to specialize in children programs and house smaller, non-aggressive animal species.

==== Renovation and repurposing ====
The Prospect Park Zoo closed to the public in June 1988. Over the next six months, new homes were found for the displaced animals in other zoos throughout the US. Demolition was managed by the Parks Department and began in June 1989. The renovation was originally estimated to cost $18 million and take two and a half years. The exteriors of the Aymar Embury buildings were preserved, but badly deteriorated interiors were gutted, pits and cages were demolished, and new structures were built. The facilities were turned over to the NY Zoological Society in April 1993. The Society aimed to designate each of its three small zoos with a specific purpose. The Central Park Zoo would be focused toward conservation; the Prospect Park Zoo would be primarily a children's zoo; and the Queens Zoo would become a zoo with North American animals.

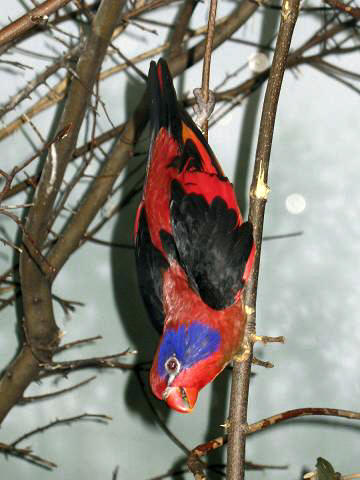
Black-winged lory at the Prospect Park Zoo

The project was not complete until 1993; it had cost $36 million in total. Though the work was substantially complete in April, a further six months were needed to repopulate the zoo, prepare exhibits, and ready the facility for the public. The repurposed zoo opened on October 5, 1993, and renamed the "Prospect Park Wildlife Conservation Center". The Zoological Society hoped that the new name would suggest that the "Wildlife Conservation Center" was far more than a mere "zoo"; it was indeed a facility designed to preserve animal species. This name change coincided with the renaming of the zoological society to the "Wildlife Conservation Society".

The programs of the new center were geared toward educating children. Classrooms for the Discovery Center were housed in a dedicated building on the north wing of the zoo. Exhibits housed smaller species, eschewing elephants, tigers, and lions, and augmented displays with interactive exhibits.

=== 21st century ===
In 2003, Mayor Michael Bloomberg proposed eliminating funding for the Prospect Park and Queens zoos to fill a citywide budget gap, effectively forcing the WCS to close the zoos. The changes would have resulted in a total savings of around $5.6 million or $5.8 million. City Council Speaker Gifford Miller visited the zoo that June, estimating that the city would save $6 million but that the WCS would have to spend $8 million to decommission the zoos and find homes for 160 displaced animals. In response to the announcement, local residents signed petitions opposing the budget cuts; one such petition garnered more than 100,000 signatures. There were discussions about restoring the funds in exchange for raising admission fees and introducing private sponsorships at the zoos, and the WCS also contemplated renting out the zoos for private events. That June, the city government ultimately agreed to restore $4.8 million for the Prospect Park and Queens zoos, though the WCS had to fire staff, discontinue programs, and double admission fees.

Funding levels for the Wildlife Conservation Society were restored in the 2007 city budget, though vulnerability to shortfalls remained. In the opening months of 2009, the WCS itself faced the prospect of losing its fiscal year 2010 New York State funding. The Prospect Park Zoo's Discovery Center reopened in December 2012 following a renovation. The discovery center included a children's play area, puzzle area, stage, activity boxes, and reading areas. The Prospect Park Zoo began displaying three Juliana pigs in 2015.

In March 2020, the Prospect Park Zoo and the WCS's other facilities were shuttered indefinitely due to the COVID-19 pandemic in New York City. The zoo reopened that July. The zoo again closed indefinitely following the September 2023 New York floods, during which basements were flooded with up to 25 feet (7.6 m) of water, and WCS workers worked on restoring power to the zoo over the following months. The WCS announced in May 2024 that the zoo would reopen to the general public on May 26, following repairs to the enclosures and mechanical systems.

== See also ==
- Heart of Brooklyn
- List of zoos in the United States
