= Tropical Storm Ophelia (2023) =

Atlantic tropical storm

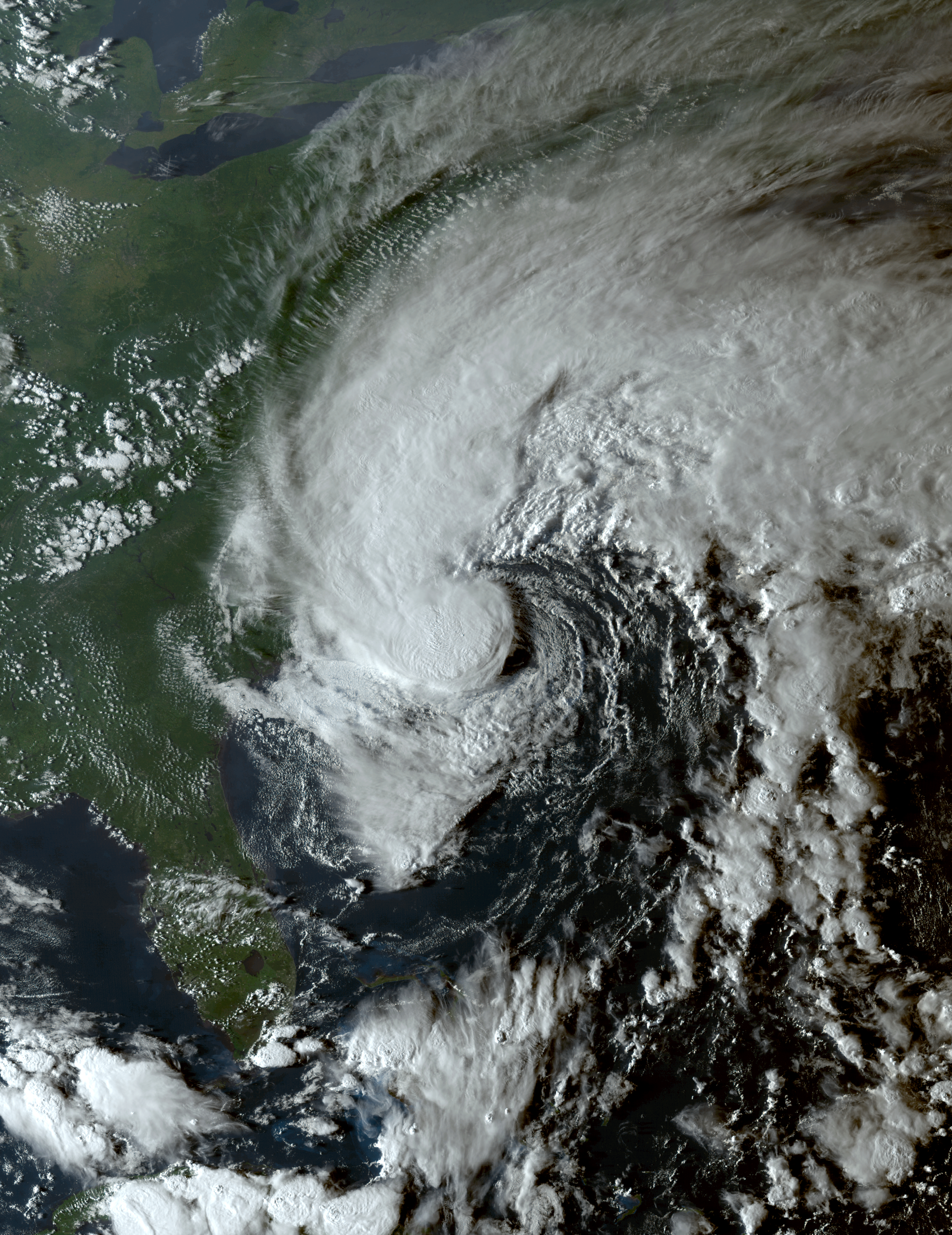
- Ophelia approaching North Carolina on the evening of September 22

Meteorological history
- Formed: September 22, 2023
- Extratropical: September 23, 2023
- Dissipated: September 25, 2023

Tropical storm
- 1-minute sustained (SSHWS/NWS)
- Highest winds: 70 mph (110 km/h)
- Lowest pressure: 981 mbar (hPa); 28.97 inHg

Overall effects
- Fatalities: None
- Damage: $450 million (2023 USD)
- Areas affected: East Coast of the United States
- Part of the 2023 Atlantic hurricane season

Tropical Storm Ophelia was a strong but short-lived tropical storm that impacted the East Coast of the United States in September 2023. The fifteenth named storm of the 2023 Atlantic hurricane season, Ophelia originated from a disturbance off the east coast of Florida before making landfall in North Carolina the next day as a strong tropical storm. Flood waters inundated coastal communities and roadways from North Carolina to New Jersey, and winds downed trees and power lines, and caused sporadic property damage.

== Meteorological history ==
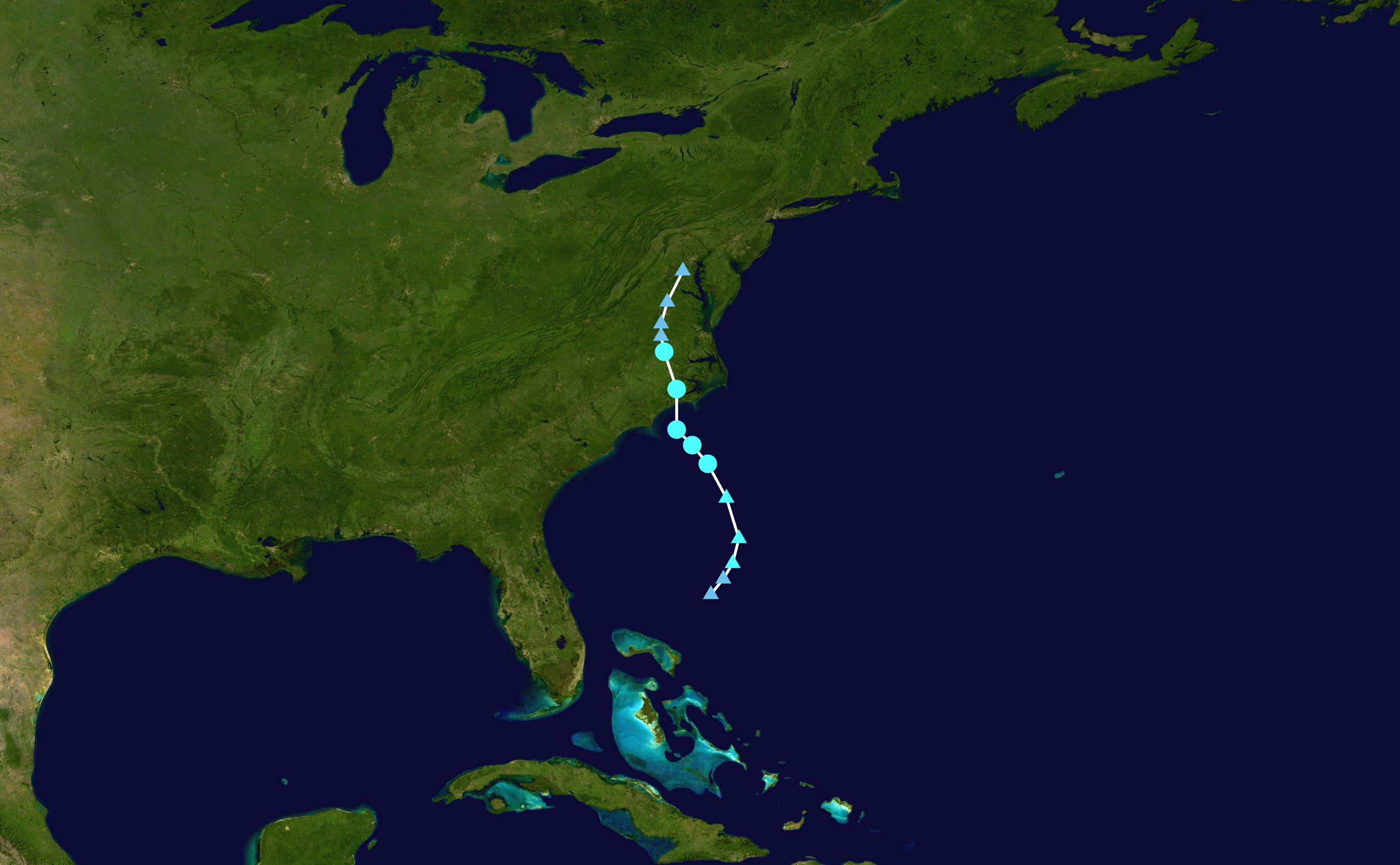
Map plotting the storm's track and intensity, according to the Saffir–Simpson scale Map key Saffir–Simpson scale Tropical depression (≤38 mph, ≤62 km/h) Tropical storm (39–73 mph, 63–118 km/h) Category 1 (74–95 mph, 119–153 km/h) Category 2 (96–110 mph, 154–177 km/h) Category 3 (111–129 mph, 178–208 km/h) Category 4 (130–156 mph, 209–251 km/h) Category 5 (≥157 mph, ≥252 km/h) Unknown Storm type Tropical cyclone Subtropical cyclone Extratropical cyclone, remnant low, tropical disturbance, or monsoon depression

On September 17, the NHC first noted the potential for tropical cyclone development near the southeast coast of the United States in its seven day outlook. A few days later, a large area of disorganized showers and thunderstorms developed east of Florida within an offshore trough of low pressure. A broad non-tropical area of low pressure formed within the area on September 21. Anticipating that the low could acquire some tropical or subtropical characteristics as it continued to form, coupled with its close proximity to the Southeastern United States, the NHC initiated advisories on it as Potential Tropical Cyclone Sixteen at 15:00 UTC that day. The system's minimum barometric pressure fell appreciably on the morning of September 22, as it moved generally northward, still attached to a frontal feature. It was generating sustained tropical storm-force winds within its broad, asymmetric wind field, and the deep convection was concentrated to the north of the poorly formed, indistinct low level center of the circulation. Later that day, it became detached from the frontal feature, and was designated Tropical Storm Ophelia. The storm made landfall at 10:15 UTC, near Emerald Isle, North Carolina, about 25 mi (40 km) west-northwest of Cape Lookout, with winds of 70 mph (115 km/h) and a minimum pressure of 981 mbar (28.97 inHg). By 0:00 UTC on September 24, the system had lost its tropical characteristics, becoming a post-tropical cyclone after crossing into southeast Virginia. The next day, its remnant circulation moved eastward off the New Jersey coast, as rains from the system swept northward into New England. The remnants of Ophelia were absorbed by another offshore low-pressure area a few days later. This low pressure ended up causing severe floods in New York City on the evening of September 29.

== Preparations and impact ==
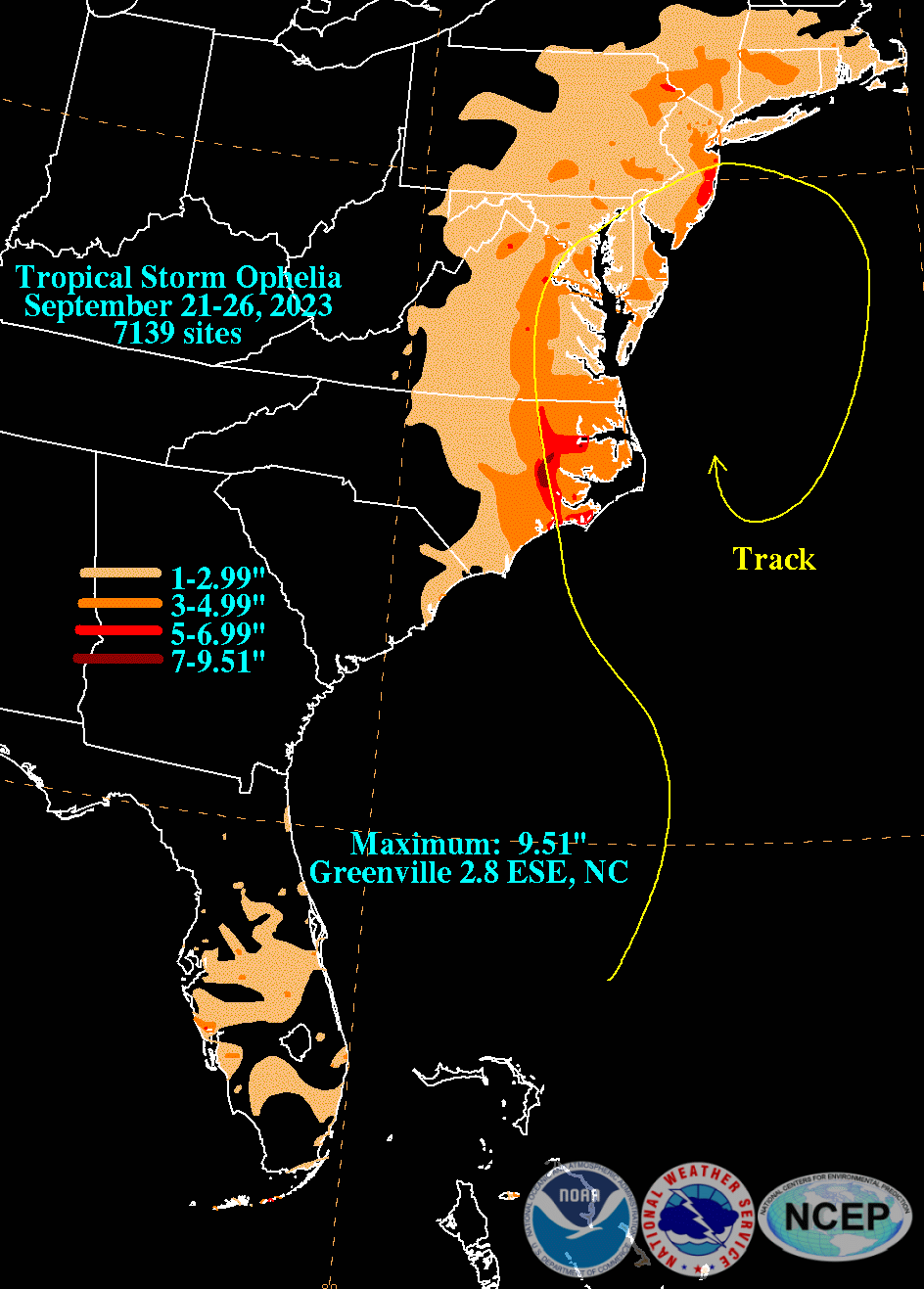
Rainfall map for Ophelia.

States of emergency were declared in Virginia, North Carolina, Maryland and New York ahead of the storm. Schools were closed for the day in coastal communities in those states. Also, four Northeast Regional Amtrak train routes were modified due to the storm. Floodwaters inundated communities and roadways along the Atlantic seaboard from North Carolina to New Jersey. The reinsurer Aon estimated the losses at $450 million.

=== Southeast ===
Cape Hatteras National Seashore, Fort Raleigh National Historic Site, Moores Creek National Battlefield and Wright Brothers National Memorial were closed, and Pamlico Sound ferry service departures were curtailed.

The highest storm surge was 3.67 ft (1.12 m) above mean sea level at Sewell's Point, Virginia. Tropical storm‑force winds from Ophelia downed trees and power lines and caused sporadic property damage along its path. Five people were rescued in a sailing vessel in coastal North Carolina. Rainfall totals reached 7.65 in (194 mm) in Cape Carteret, North Carolina, and 9.51 in (242 mm) in Greenville, North Carolina. An EF0 tornado occurred in Belvidere, North Carolina early on September 23. At the height of storm, more than 70,000 electric utility customers in North Carolina and Virginia were without power.

=== Mid-Atlantic ===
Major League Baseball games scheduled for September 23, at Nationals Park in Washington, D.C. and Yankee Stadium in New York City, were postponed due to the storm, while a game on September 24 at Citizens Bank Park was delayed for five hours. Additionally, on September 23, thoroughbred racing at Aqueduct in New York City, Pimlico in Baltimore, Maryland, and Delaware Park in Stanton, Delaware, was canceled. In preparation for the storm, Cape May County Park & Zoo closed and the Cape May–Lewes Ferry was suspended on September 23.

Heavy rain also fell along the Mid-Atlantic, with state maximums occurred at Huntingtown, Maryland; Millsboro, Delaware; and Carlisle, Pennsylvania, and a regional maximum at 5.63 in (143 mm) in Toms River, New Jersey. A person was injured in Washington D.C. when a tree fell on a Metrobus. In Ocean City, Maryland, wind gusts reached 48 mph (77 km/h), causing $21,000 in damage throughout the city, with a 40 mph (64 km/h) wind gust in Salisbury, Maryland also causing $21,000 in damage. Over 13,000 power outages occurred in the state of New Jersey alone, where wind gusts reached as high as 62 mph (100 km/h) in North Beach Haven. On September 25, slick roads resulted in several bridges in Staten Island having speed limits reduced. On September 26, at Citi Field, a New York Mets game against the Miami Marlins was postponed due to unplayable field conditions from the heavy rainfall from the previous four days.

== See also ==
- Weather of 2023
- Tropical cyclones in 2023
- Other tropical cyclones named Ophelia
- Timeline of the 2023 Atlantic hurricane season
- List of North Carolina hurricanes (2000–present)
- Hurricane Diana (1984) – made landfall in North Carolina as a Category 2 hurricane, moved offshore and affected similar areas
- Tropical Storm Ana (2015) – off-season storm that struck South Carolina
- Tropical Storm Bertha (2020) – a rapidly forming and short-lived off-season tropical storm that affected the Eastern United States
- Tropical Storm Chantal (2025) — tropical storm that impacted similar areas
