= Willink Plaza =

Intersection in Brooklyn, New York

Coordinates: 40.663296°N 73.96277°W

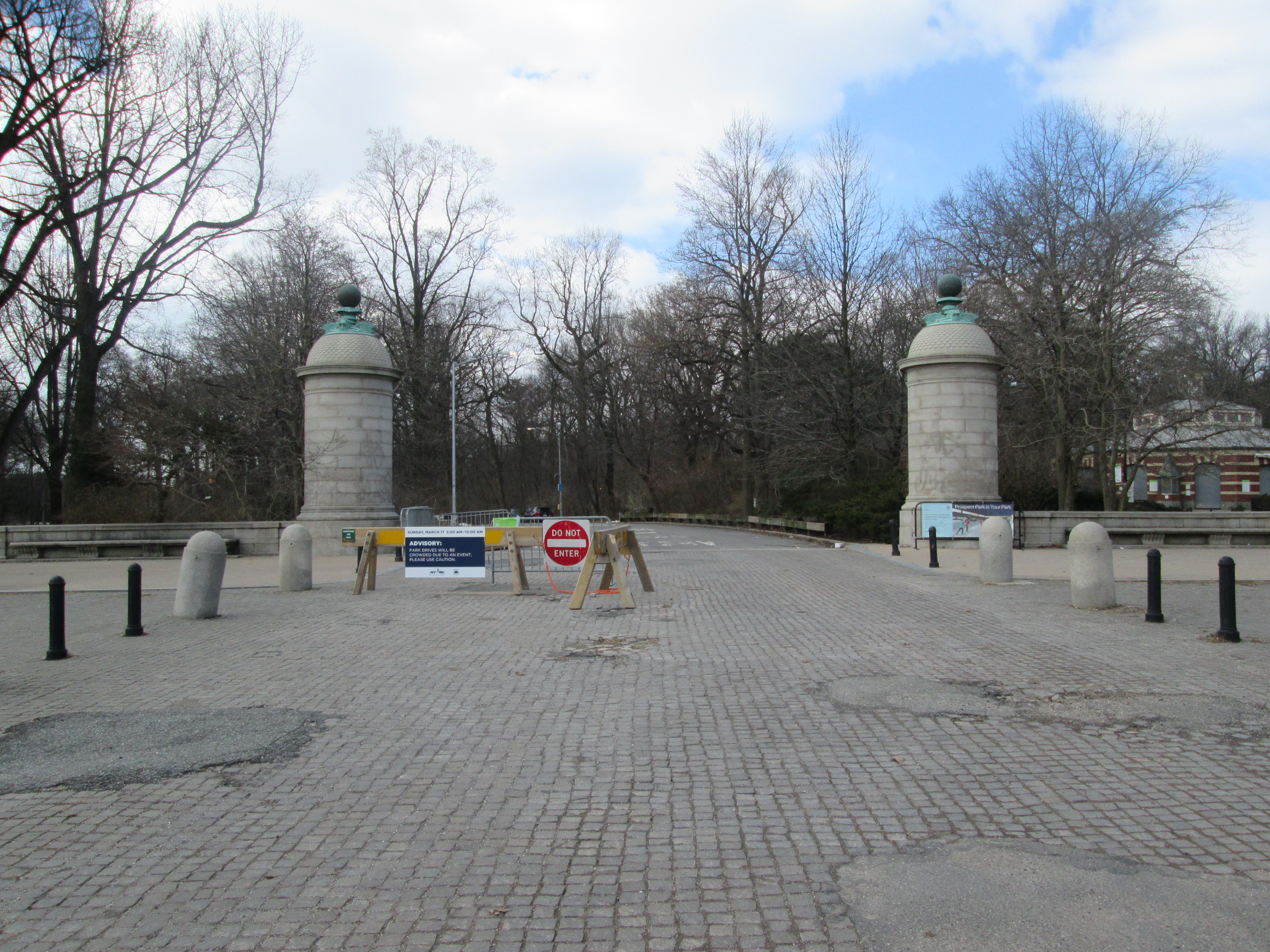
Willink Entrance to Prospect Park.

The Willink Entrance area, also known as Willink Plaza, is a major urban square of Brooklyn, New York City, formed by the intersection of Flatbush Avenue, Ocean Avenue and Empire Boulevard, at the eastern corner of Prospect Park and the southern corner of the Brooklyn Botanic Garden. It is serviced by the New York City Subway's Prospect Park station, and features several public spaces and historic buildings. This location is considered the northwestern point of the Prospect Lefferts Gardens neighborhood of Flatbush, and adjoins Crown Heights to its northeast.

== Early history and layout ==
The Willink family, eastern neighbors of the Lefferts family, owned an estate here. Willink Hill, lying along Ocean Avenue, and the Willink Entrance of Prospect Park are named after them. The Willink house was relocated and repurposed for a time as the Melrose Hotel beside the predecessor of the Prospect Park station.

At the turn of the 20th century, there were steps taken toward developing a pedestrianized plaza, but this was never fully realized, and the intersection is rarely given a proper name today. The only property that was eventually acquired by the city was the Melrose Hotel site at the corner of Flatbush Avenue and Ocean Avenue.

The Malbone Street Wreck occurred under this intersection in 1918, and the disaster's notoriety led to the renaming of "Malbone Street" to Empire Boulevard. There was a centennial commemoration here in 2018, and the following anniversary was marked by a historic plaque being installed at the Prospect Park station, and the corner being co-named “Malbone Centennial Way”.

There are two small median islands with trees just north and south of the intersection on Flatbush Avenue. As of 2019 It has recently had proposals for greater traffic calming in this area.

== Green side ==
Map of notable buildings and structures at Prospect Park (note: not all entrances shown). Click on points for more details.

On the green side to the northwest, there is the Willink Entrance to Prospect Park, on the west side and just north of the intersection on Flatbush Avenue, marked by two granite turrets. This entrance is currently under reconstruction. Further north on this side is the section of family-friendly attractions known as the "Children's Corner", which include the Prospect Park Carousel, Lefferts Historic House, and the Prospect Park Zoo.

The Brooklyn Botanic Garden also has a Flatbush Avenue entrance on the east side, with a brickwork arch, and adjoins a landmarked fire building on Empire Boulevard.

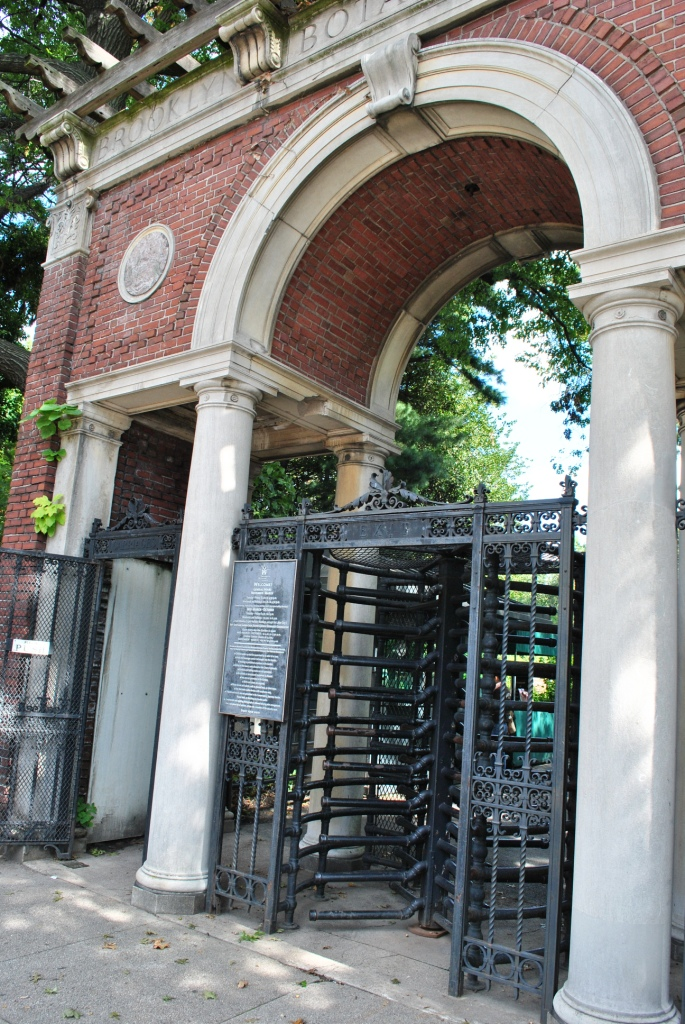

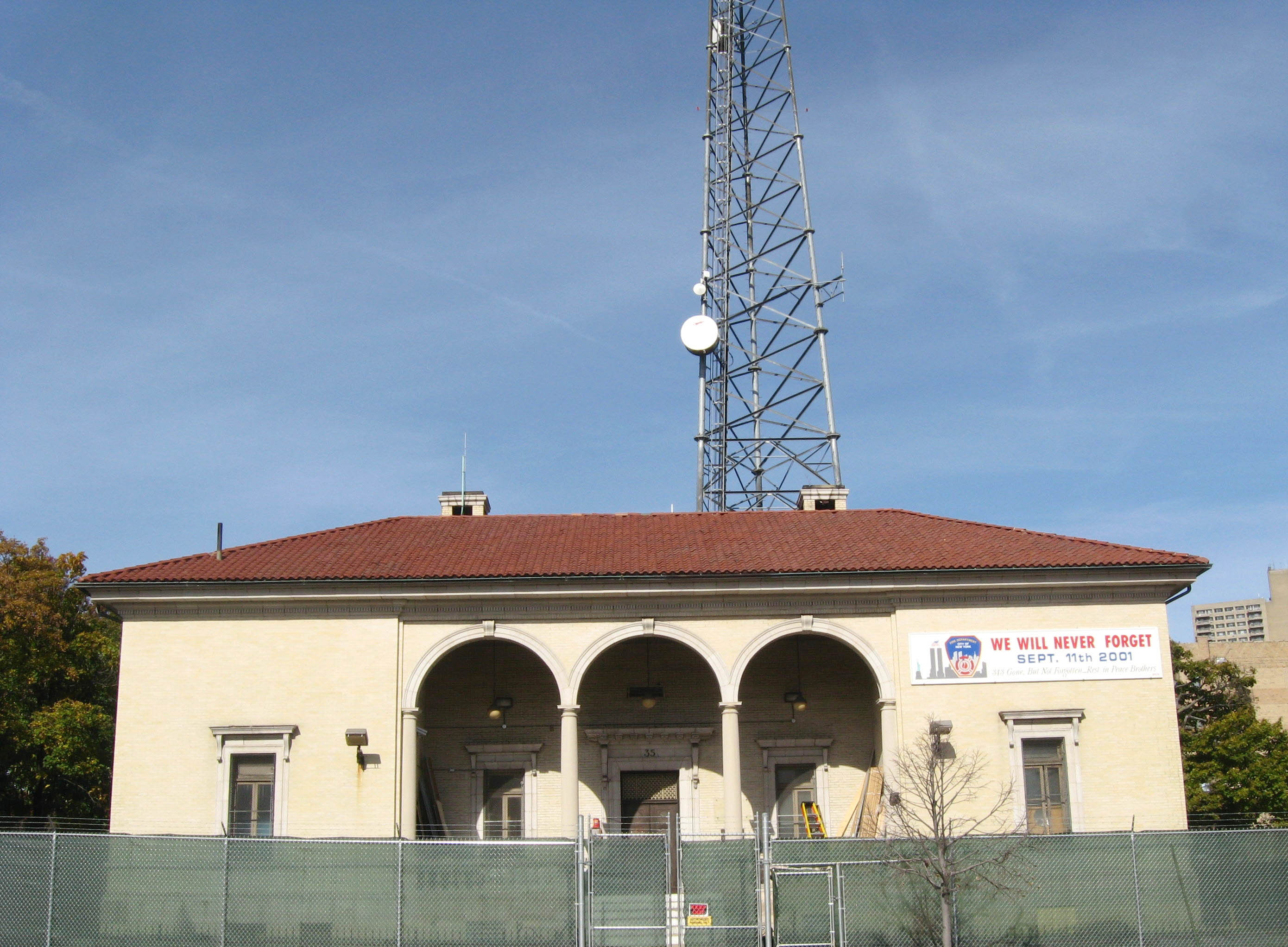

== Urban side ==
On the urban side to the southeast, on the west side of Flatbush Avenue, there is the Prospect Park station and its northern exit, featuring Prospect Park Zoo artwork. On the adjoining corner with Ocean Avenue, there is the city property which includes an MTA parking lot and the "Flatbush Trees", a sculptural gateway sign to the neighborhood. These three concrete cylinders with green sheet metal canopies were installed in 1979 in the shape of a logo design by the predecessor of the Carbone Smolan Agency as part of an urban branding of the neighborhood, and were redecorated in 2015 with vinyl decals representing flowers. The artist Swoon also exhibited an installation here in 2021.

On the east side of Flatbush Avenue, there is the historic Bond Bread Bakery with its prominent clock tower.

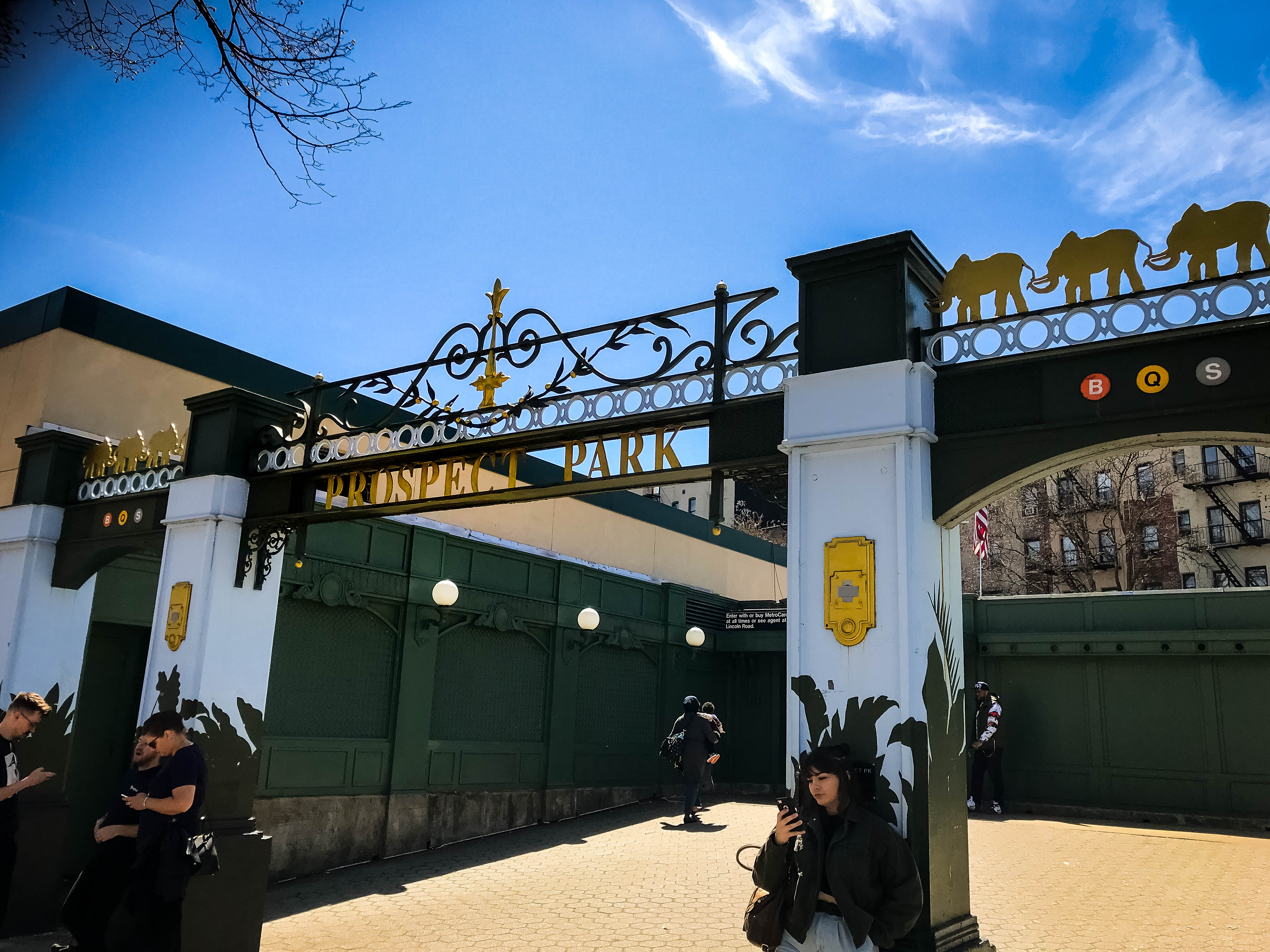

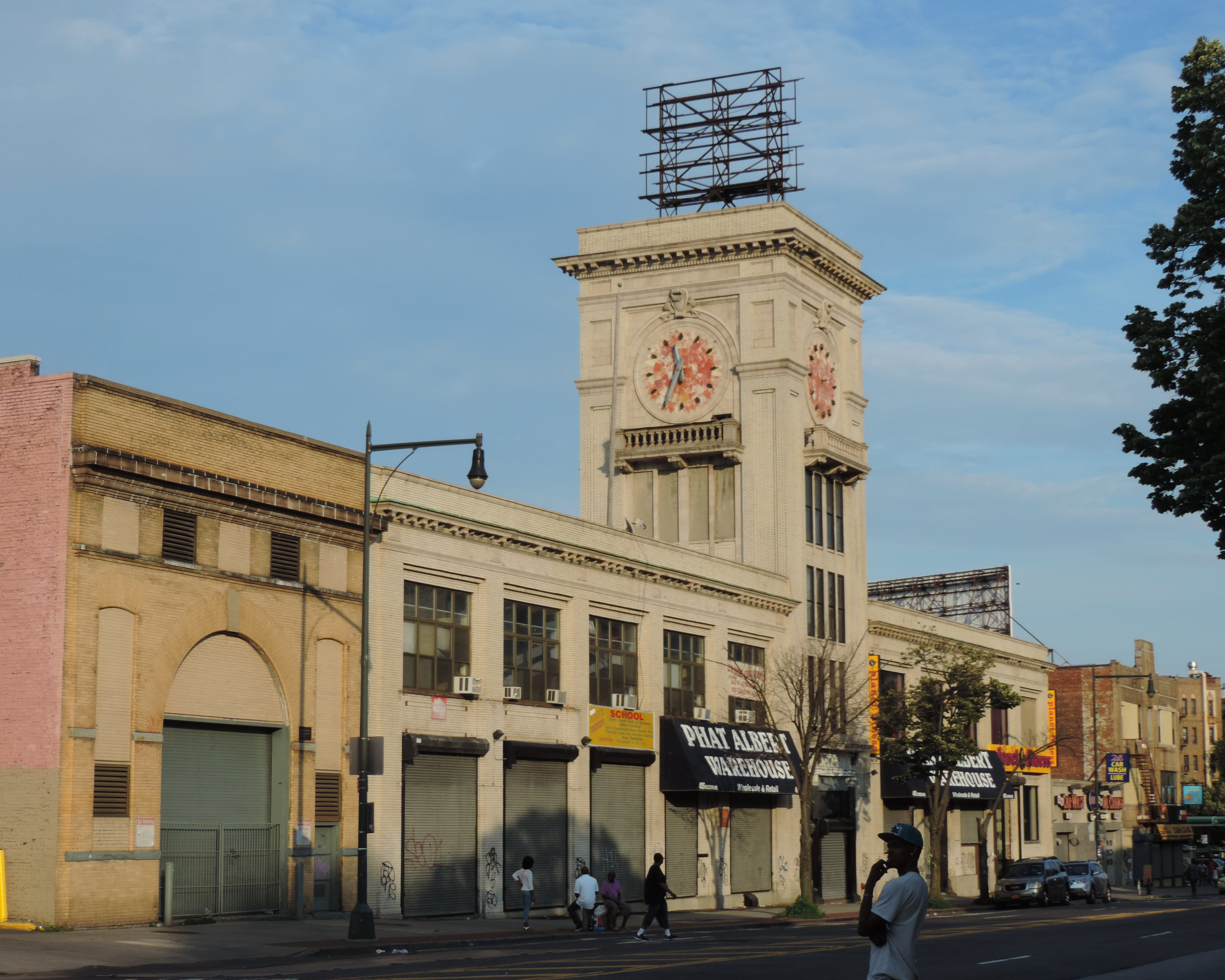

== See also ==
- Grand Army Plaza
