= Tropical cyclones in 2023 =

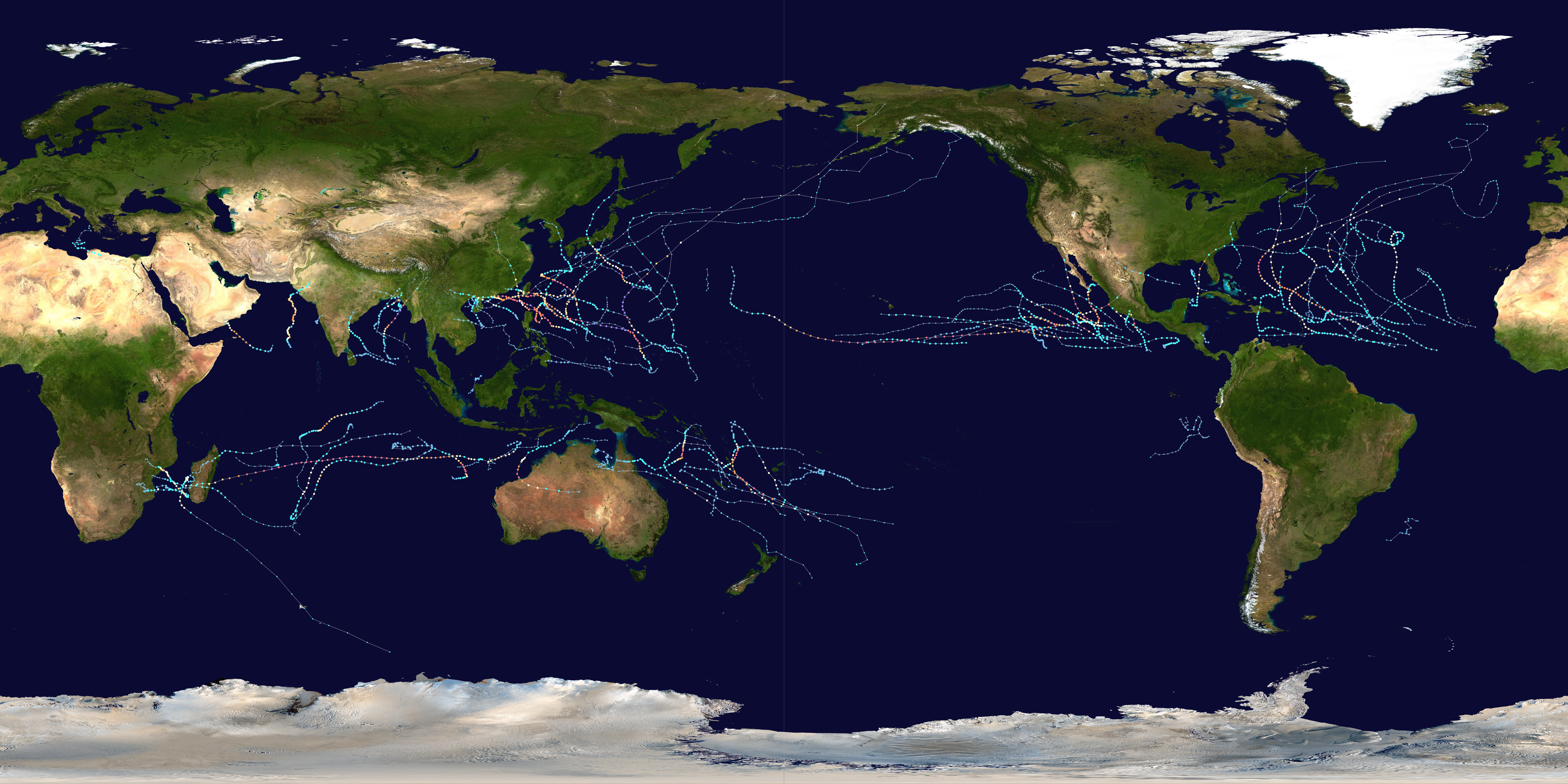
- Year summary map

Year boundaries
- First system: 03F
- Formed: January 5, 2023
- Last system: Alvaro
- Dissipated: January 3, 2024

Strongest system
- Name: Mawar
- Lowest pressure: 900 mbar (hPa); 26.58 inHg

Longest lasting system
- Name: Freddy (Longest-lasting tropical system on record)
- Duration: 36 days

Year statistics
- Total systems: 115 (+ 1 unofficial)
- Named systems: 79 (+ 1 unofficial)
- Total fatalities: 8,255 (26) (Note: The number in the bracket indicates indirect deaths.)
- Total damage: > $98.04 billion (2023 USD)
Related articles
- 2023 Atlantic hurricane season
- 2023 Pacific hurricane season
- 2023 Pacific typhoon season
- 2023 North Indian Ocean cyclone season
- 2022–23 South-West Indian Ocean cyclone season
- 2023–24 South-West Indian Ocean cyclone season
- 2022–23 Australian region cyclone season
- 2023–24 Australian region cyclone season
- 2022–23 South Pacific cyclone season
- 2023–24 South Pacific cyclone season

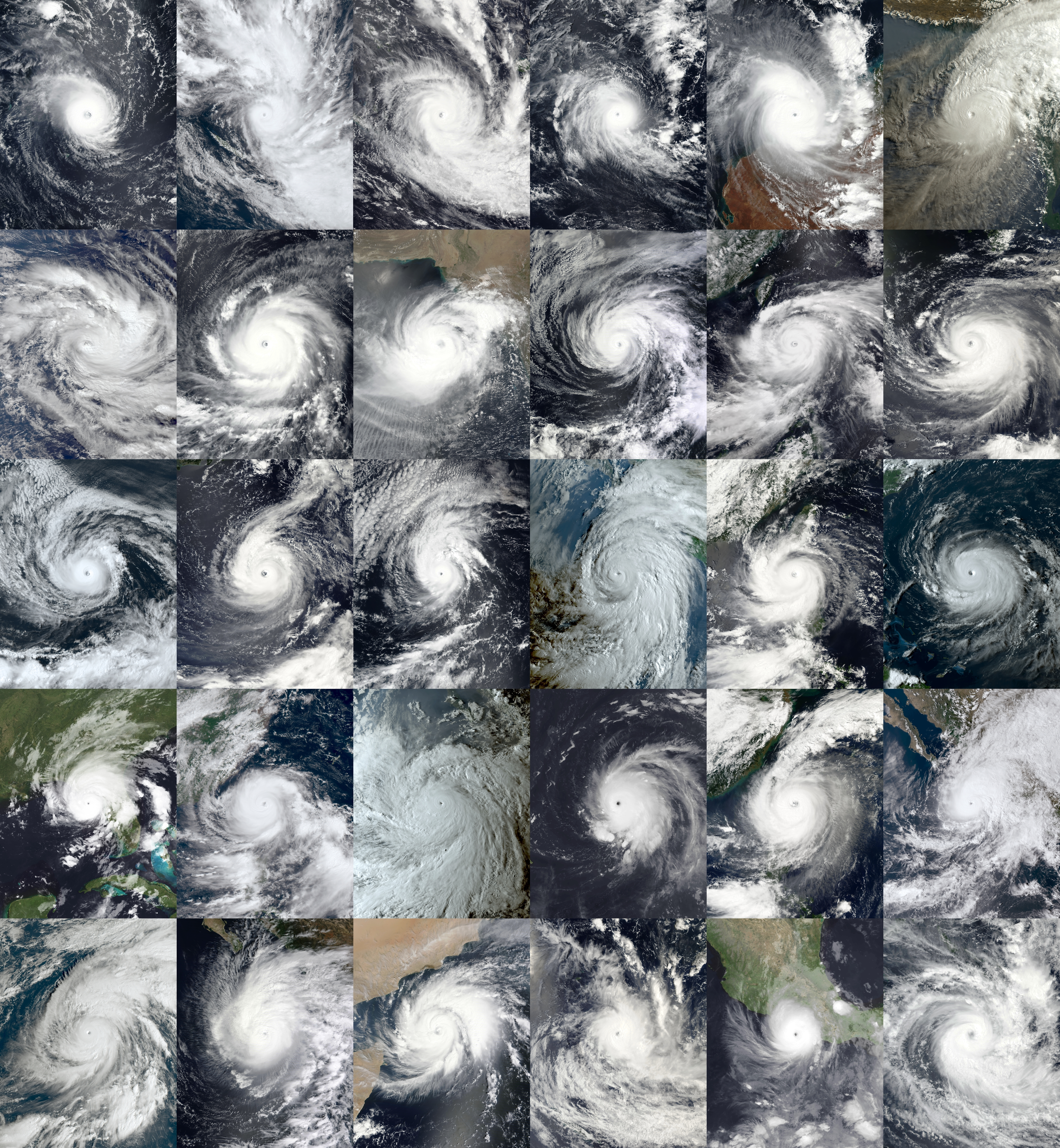
Satellite photos of 30 tropical cyclones worldwide that reached at least Category 3 on the Saffir–Simpson scale throughout 2023, from Freddy in February to Jasper in December. Among them, Mawar (second image in the second row) was the most intense with a minimum central pressure of 900 hPa.

During 2023, tropical cyclones formed in seven major bodies of water, commonly known as tropical cyclone basins. They were named by various weather agencies when they attained maximum sustained winds of 35 knots (65 km/h; 40 mph). Throughout the year, a total of 115 systems formed, with 79 of them being named. The most intense storm of the year was Typhoon Mawar, which had a minimum pressure of 900 hPa (26.58 inHg). The deadliest tropical cyclone of the year was Storm Daniel, which killed at least 5,591 people in Libya, Greece, Turkey, and Bulgaria. Meanwhile, the costliest tropical cyclone was Typhoon Doksuri which caused at least $28.4 billion (USD) worth of damage in China, the Philippines and Taiwan, becoming the costliest on record outside the Atlantic Ocean basin. Among this year's systems, thirty became major tropical cyclones, of which nine intensified into Category 5 tropical cyclones on the Saffir–Simpson scale (SSHWS), the most since 2018. The accumulated cyclone energy (ACE) index for 2023 across all seven basins, as calculated by Colorado State University (CSU), was 857.4 units, which was above the 1991–2020 mean of 770.2 units.

The most active basin in the year was the North Atlantic Ocean, which had 20 named systems. The Eastern Pacific Ocean had an above-average and destructive season, with 17 named storms forming; 10 of those became hurricanes, of which 8 strengthened into major hurricanes – double the seasonal average. The Western Pacific Ocean had a total of 17 named storms, making it the second least active season in the basin, tying with 1998. The North Indian Ocean was unusually active, with six named storms forming, producing the second-most accumulated cyclone energy in this basin on record, only behind 2019. Activity across the southern hemisphere's three basins (South-West Indian, Australian, and South Pacific) was fairly significant, with the regions recording 17 named storms altogether, with the most intense Southern Hemisphere cyclone of the year, Cyclone Kevin in the South Pacific basin, peaking with a central pressure of 913 hPa (26.96 inHg).

Tropical cyclones were primarily monitored by ten warning centers across the world, which are designated as a Regional Specialized Meteorological Center (RSMC) or a Tropical Cyclone Warning Center (TCWC) by the World Meteorological Organization (WMO). These ten centers are the National Hurricane Center (NHC) and the Central Pacific Hurricane Center (CPHC), Japan Meteorological Agency (JMA), Indian Meteorological Department (IMD), Météo-France (MFR), Indonesia's Meteorology, Climatology, and Geophysical Agency (BMKG), the Australian Bureau of Meteorology (BoM), Papua New Guinea's National Weather Service (PNGNWS), the Fiji Meteorological Service (FMS), and New Zealand's MetService. Unofficial, but still notable, warning centres include the Philippine Atmospheric, Geophysical and Astronomical Services Administration (PAGASA), the United States's Joint Typhoon Warning Center (JTWC), and the Brazilian Navy Hydrographic Center.

== Global atmospheric and hydrological conditions ==
On February 9, the NOAA made a new ENSO forecast stating that the La Niña is still ongoing but will transition into an ENSO-Neutral soon. It says that there is around a 5% chance that the La Niña persists throughout March and around a 95% chance of an ENSO-Neutral in March. NOAA announced an El Nino later in the year.

== Summary ==
=== North Atlantic Ocean ===
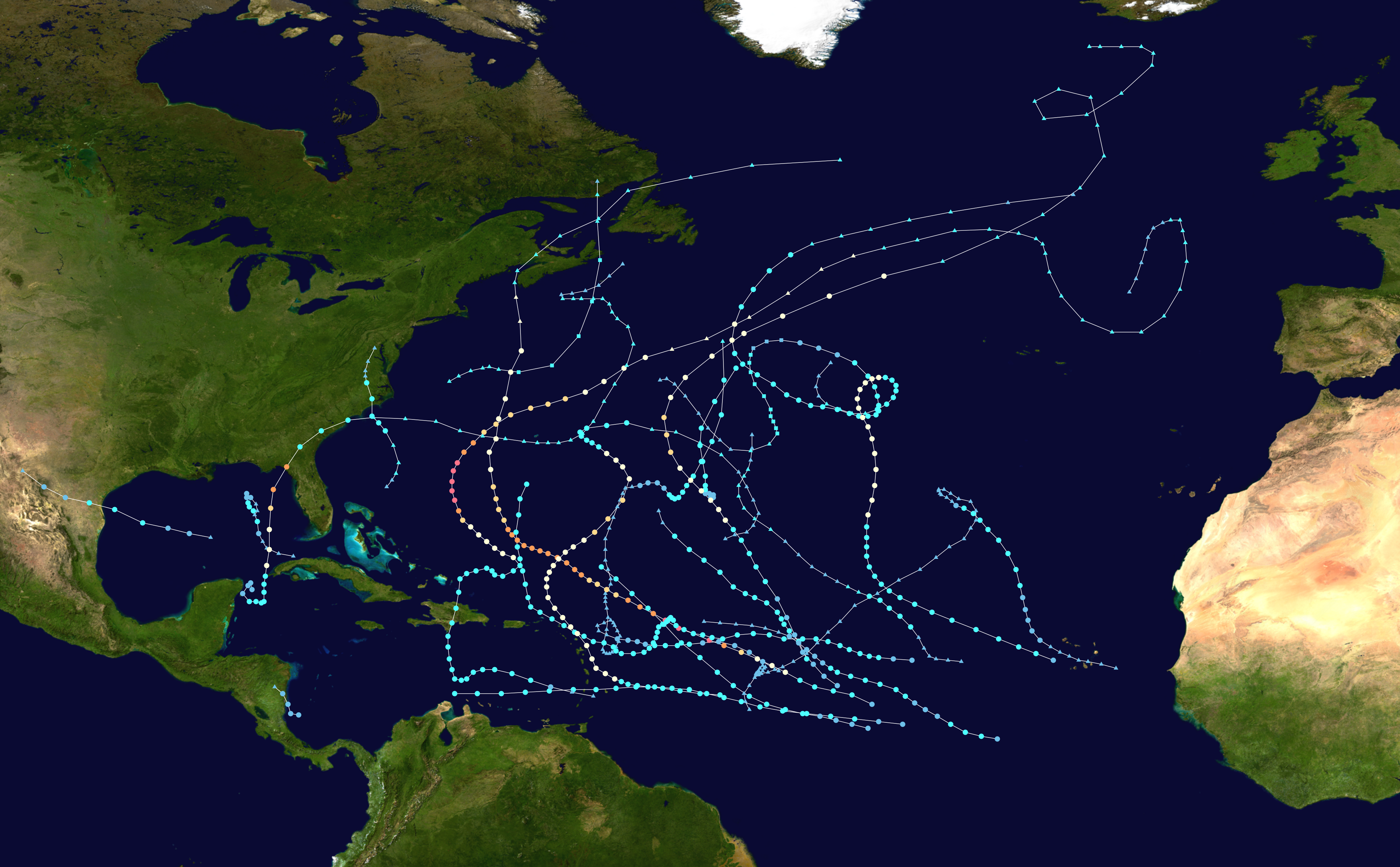
2023 Atlantic hurricane season summary map

The season was the fourth-most active Atlantic hurricane season on record with 20 named storms, (Note: The total includes an unnamed, belatedly recognized subtropical storm in January.) tied with 1933. Among them, 7 became hurricanes, with 3 reaching major hurricane strength. (Note: Hurricanes reaching Category 3 and higher—1-minute sustained winds higher than 110 miles per hour (178 km/h)—on the Saffir–Simpson scale are described as major hurricanes.) The season also had an above‑normal accumulated cyclone energy (ACE) rating of 146, despite the presence of El Niño, which typically results in less activity, and had the most storms for an El Niño year on record, largely due to record-warm sea surface temperatures across the Atlantic. The season officially began on June 1, 2023, and ended November 30. Nontherless, it unexpectedly commenced on January 16, when an unnamed subtropical storm formed off the northeastern U.S. coast then moved over Atlantic Canada. Operationally, the NHC considered the storm to be non-tropical, with minimal likelihood of transitioning into a subtropical or tropical cyclone, however a post-storm evaluation of the system to determine its proper classification was conducted by a team of forecasters from the NHC and Ocean Prediction Center (OPC). As a result, it was re-designated as subtropical prior to the official start of the season. Tropical Storm Arlene began as a tropical depression on June 1, in the Gulf of Mexico, and became the season's first named storm on June 2. Later that month, when Tropical Storm Bret and Tropical Storm Cindy formed, there were two Atlantic tropical cyclones active simultaneously in June for the first time since 1968. The two developed in the Main Development Region (MDR) from successive tropical waves coming off the coast of West Africa. Their formation also marked the first time on record that two tropical storms have formed in the MDR during the month of June. Next, Subtropical Storm Don formed over the central Atlantic on July 14. A long-lived storm, it later became fully tropical and strengthened into the season's first hurricane as it meandered around the ocean far from land.

Following a lull in activity, tropical cyclogenesis picked up drastically in late August. Within a span of 39 hours during August 20–22, four tropical storms formed: Emily, Franklin, Gert, and Harold. This marked the fastest time four storms were named within the Atlantic basin, surpassing the previous mark of 48 hours, set in 1893 and matched in 1980. Emily formed in the eastern Atlantic, lasting only 24 hours before dissipating. Franklin moved across the Dominican Republic, before intensifying into a Category 4 hurricane in the western Atlantic. Gert became a remnant low on August 22, but regenerated into a tropical cyclone ten days later, on September 1. Tropical Storm Harold affected south Texas and brought much needed rainfall to the region. Those four were followed by two more systems during last week of the month: Idalia, and Jose. Idalia formed on August 26 in the Northwestern Caribbean, intensified into a Category 4 hurricane, then made landfall in the Big Bend region of Florida at Category 3 strength. Tropical Storm Jose formed in the open Atlantic on August 31.

The quick pace of storm formation continued into September, the climatological peak of the hurricane season. On September 1, Tropical Storm Katia formed northwest of Cabo Verde in the far eastern Atlantic. After Gert and Katia dissipated, Tropical Storm Lee formed in the central tropical Atlantic on September 5. It became a hurricane a day later, then rapidly intensified to Category 5 strength, with its winds increasing by 85 mph (135 km/h) during the 24‑hour period ending at 06:00 UTC on September 8. This made Lee the fourth‑fastest intensifying Atlantic hurricane on record, behind only Milton, Felix and Wilma. Lee later made multiple landfalls in Atlantic Canada as an extratropical cyclone. Tropical Storm Margot formed next, and strengthened into the season's fifth hurricane on September 11. They were joined by Tropical Depression Fifteen, later Hurricane Nigel, which formed midway between the Lesser Antilles and Cabo Verde Islands on September 15. Nigel remained far from any land masses, and became extratropical on September 22. That same day, Tropical Storm Ophelia formed offshore of North Carolina. The storm moved inland the following morning at near-hurricane strength. Also on September 23, Tropical Storm Philippe formed in the eastern tropical Atlantic. Right behind Philippe came Tropical Storm Rina five days later. At that time, Philippe and Rina were approximately 620 mi (1,000 km) apart, which is close enough to influence each other's movement and development.

After a brief letup in activity, Tropical Storm Sean formed on October 11, in the eastern tropical Atlantic. Later, on October 18, Hurricane Tammy formed. It made landfall on Barbuda, the second system in three weeks to do so, in addition to Philippe. A few days later, short-lived Tropical Depression Twenty-One formed offshore Nicaragua, moved inland, and soon dissipated. The season effectively ended when Tammy dissipated on October 29. No tropical cyclones formed in the Atlantic in the month of November for the first time since 2018, though a disturbance over the Caribbean Sea was briefly designated as a potential tropical cyclone during the month, but it did not organize into a tropical cyclone.

Despite the above-normal activity this season, El Niño‑enhanced wind shear prevented most storms from strengthening. The El Niño event also weakened the Bermuda High, allowing systems to curve northward or take more easterly tracks out to sea, as opposed to being pushed westward towards the continental United States, Mexico, or Central America. As a result, only a few systems impacted land or caused significant damage this season, with just three making landfall in the U.S. The systems of this season collectively produced at least $3.09 billion (USD) (Note: All damage figures are in 2023 USD, unless otherwise noted) in damage, and caused 16 fatalities.

=== Eastern and Central Pacific Ocean ===
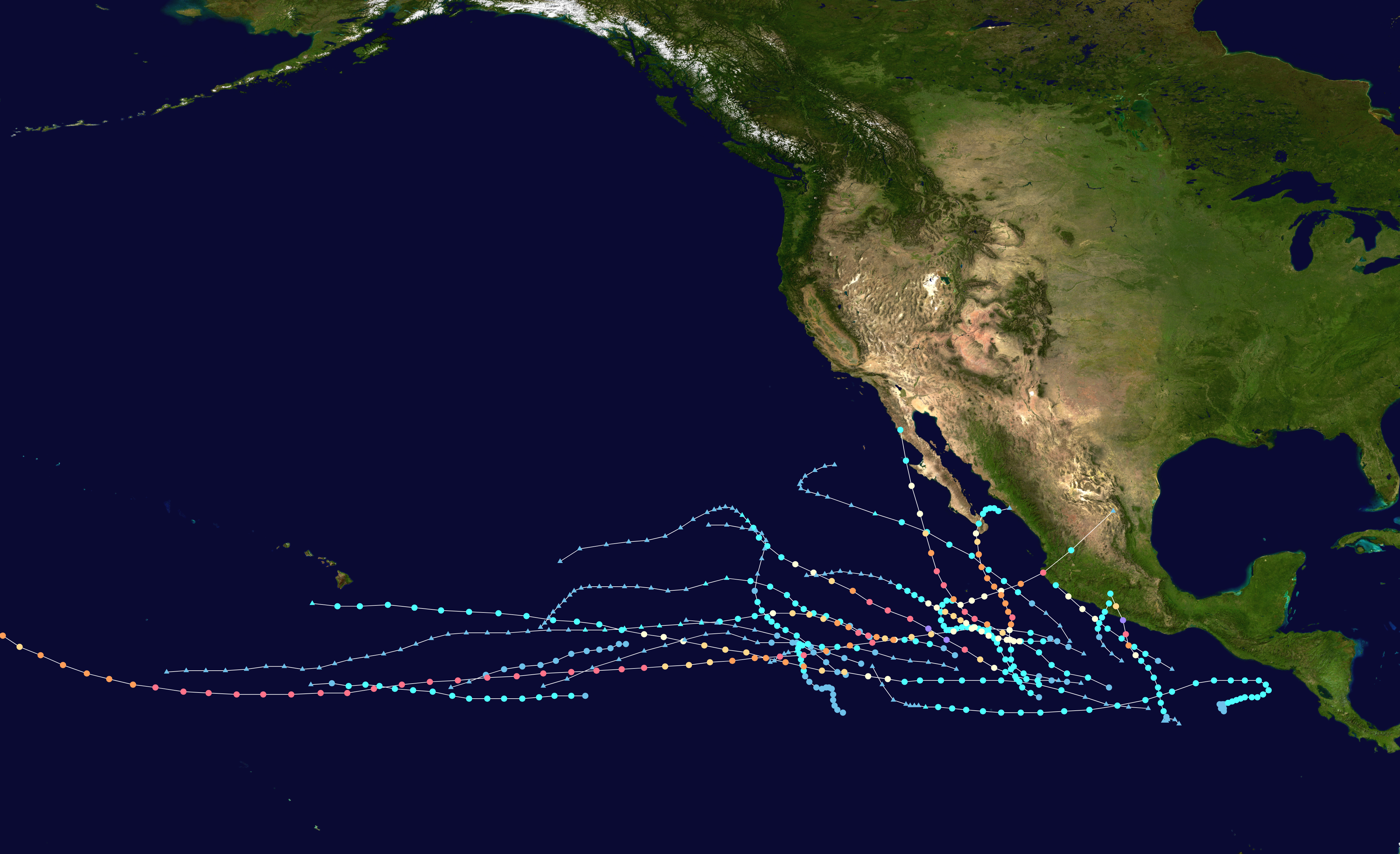
2023 Pacific hurricane season summary map

Overall, 20 tropical cyclones formed, of which 17 reached tropical storm intensity and were named. A total of 10 of these storms became hurricanes, and eight became major hurricanes. The season was very active compared to the previous below-to-normal seasons since 2019. Despite this, no tropical cyclones formed in the Central Pacific for the fourth consecutive year. At least 66 fatalities were recorded and damage totaled US$16.87 billion, mostly due to Hurricane Otis which was the first Pacific hurricane to make landfall at Category 5 intensity, surpassing Hurricane Patricia as the strongest landfalling Pacific hurricane on record. The season's activity, east of 140°W, was reflected with an above-average cumulative accumulated cyclone energy (ACE) rating of 164, roughly 115% of the 30-year median. The season officially began on May 15 in the Eastern Pacific, and on June 1 in the Central Pacific; both ended officially on November 30. The above-average activity levels were largely attributed to the strong El Niño event, which brought anomalously high sea surface temperatures and low vertical wind shear to western parts of the basin.

The first several weeks of this Eastern Pacific hurricane season were quiet, as the first system, Hurricane Adrian, did not develop until June 27. Typically, the first named storm forms around June 10. Two days later, as Adrian moved out into the open Pacific, Hurricane Beatriz formed near and tracked parallel to the Mexican coast. Next came Hurricane Calvin, which formed off the southwestern coast of Mexico during the second week of July and became the first major hurricane of the season as it moved steadily west-northwestward toward Hawaii. Hurricane Dora ushered in August by rapidly intensifying to a Category 4 hurricane, while also tracking toward Hawaii. On August 11, Dora crossed the International Dateline to become only the second tropical cyclone on record to be at hurricane strength in the Eastern, Central and Western Pacific basins, the other being John in 1994. Additionally, Dora maintained Category 4 intensity longer than any Pacific hurricane on record. (Note: Interrupted time, as Dora did temporarily weaken below Category 4 intensity for a period of time and then rebounded.)

Another early August system, short-lived Tropical Storm Eugene, formed and remained well offshore Mexico. It was soon followed by Category 4 Hurricane Fernanda and Tropical Storm Greg; neither system passed near land. Next came Hurricane Hilary, the season's third Category 4 system, which made landfall along Mexico's Baja California peninsula as a tropical storm before moving up into Southern California. Heavy rainfall drenched both regions, resulting in widespread flooding and numerous mudslides. At the beginning of September, Hurricane Jova formed, and underwent explosive intensification, to become the first Category 5 hurricane in the Eastern Pacific Ocean since 2018. Later that month, Tropical Storm Kenneth formed southwest of Baja California.

Then, during the first part of October, two systems, Category 4 Hurricane Lidia and Tropical Storm Max, formed. Both made landfall along the southwestern coast of Mexico: Max in Guerrero on October 9, and Lidia in Jalisco on October 10. In mid-October, Hurricane Norma rapidly intensified to Category 4 strength as it moved towards the Baja California peninsula. Several days later, Hurricane Otis unexpectedly underwent explosive intensification, strengthening from a 50 mph (85 km/h) tropical storm to a 160 mph (260 km/h) Category 5 hurricane in 12 hours, an increase of 110 mph (175 km/h), a documented 24-hour intensity increase (for Eastern Pacific hurricanes) behind only Hurricane Patricia. Otis then became first Pacific hurricane to make landfall at Category 5 intensity, causing over $10 billion (USD) (Note: All damage totals are valued as of 2023 and in United States dollars, unless otherwise noted.) in damage in and around Acapulco. The fifth and last system to form in October, Tropical Storm Pilar, formed offshore Central America on October 28; heavy rains from the storm caused flash flooding in the region. Later, with one week remaining in the season, Tropical Storm Ramon formed far from land, then degenerated to a remnant low on November 26, marking the end of tropical activity in the basin for the season.

=== Western Pacific Ocean ===
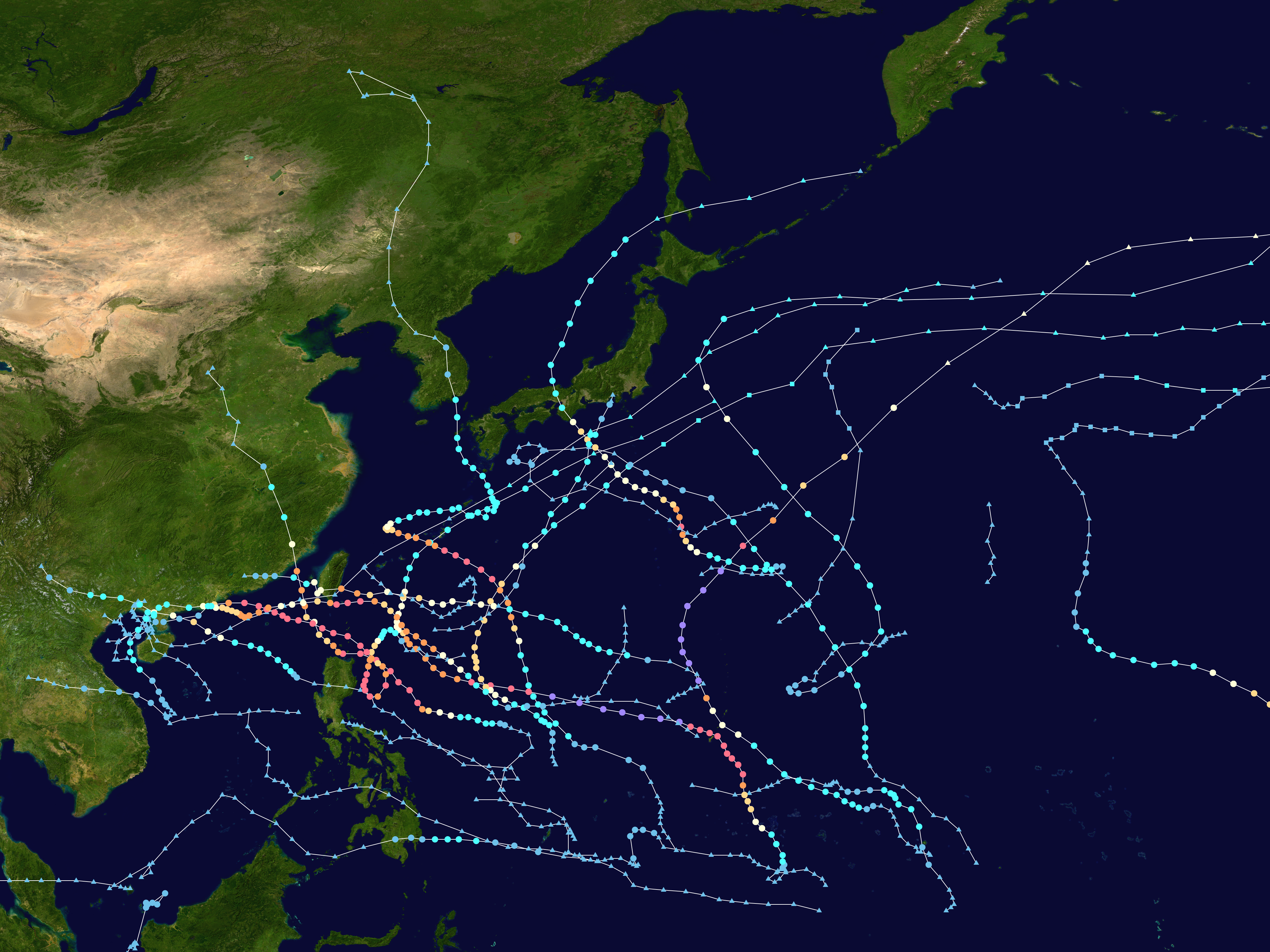
2023 Pacific typhoon season summary map

The season began on March 4 with the formation of a tropical depression which formed near the equator, east of Singapore. The depression was short lived and was last noted three days later. The storm however, brought heavy rainfall across Malaysia, affecting about 50,000 people.

A month later on April 7, the JMA began tracking a low-pressure area located in the Philippines Sea. On the same day the JMA classified the system as a tropical depression with the PAGASA naming the system Amang. The depression made three landfalls in Panganiban, Catanduanes; Presentacion, Camarines Sur; and Lagonoy, Camarines Sur, before weakening into a remnant low on April 13. Amang caused minor damage across the country however, no fatalities were reported. Five days after Amang dissipated, the JMA began monitoring another disturbance located near Pohnpei. After slowly intensifying, the system reached tropical storm status and the system was named Sanvu by the JMA; becoming the first named storm in the basin. Sanvu however began to weaken after entering hostile environment. The storm weakened back into a tropical depression until it dissipated on April 25.

On May 5, a tropical depression was noted in the Sulu Sea by the JMA. The system crossed Palawan and entered the South China Sea on the same day. The system continued to traverse the South China Sea before dissipating on May 7. On May 19, a tropical depression developed south-southwest of the Chuuk islands. A few hours later, it became a tropical storm and was named Mawar. On the next day, the JMA upgraded the system to a severe tropical storm, as the storm was getting better defined. A day later, Mawar was classified as a Category 1-equivalent typhoon by the JTWC. The JMA followed suit and designated the system as a Typhoon on the same day; becoming the first typhoon of the year in the basin. Mawar later strengthened into a Category 2-equivalent typhoon on May 22. Then, the storm began to explosively intensify and reached Category 3-equivalent status on the same day. It further strengthened into a Category 4-equivalent super typhoon on the next day as it approached Guam. Land interaction with Guam and an eyewall replacement cycle caused the storm to weaken slightly but eventually restrengthened after passing the northern tip of Guam on May 24. The next day, Mawar completed its eyewall replacement cycle and went on to reach its peak intensity of 295 km/h (185 mph), making it a very strong Category 5-equivalent super typhoon. As Mawar entered the PAR which was named Betty by PAGASA, it encountered cooler oceans and increasing wind shear which caused it to weaken. It also underwent yet another eyewall replacement cycle causing the storm to weaken further. It affected the eastern coast of Luzon and weakened to a severe tropical storm as it left the PAR on June 1. It affected the Okinawa Islands and finally turned extratropical south of Honshu on June 3.

On June 5, a low-pressure area was formed north of Palau, naming the system as Invest 98W. At the following day, it intensified and entered the Philippine area of responsibility, prompting PAGASA to name the storm as Chedeng at 08:00 UTC. The JTWC later followed suit and designated it as 03W. At 20:00 UTC, Chedeng was upgraded to a tropical storm, receiving the international name Guchol. Guchol later became a strong Category 2-equivalent typhoon in the Philippine Sea, but the cold wake from Typhoon Mawar kept it from intensifying any further. As Guchol (Chedeng) exited the PAR, it weakened to a severe tropical storm, and continued northeastwards, avoiding the Japanese archipelago.

On July 13, A monsoon depression formed near Luzon. PAGASA noted the system and subsequently named the system Dodong. The system then crossed the island. The system then entered the South China Sea, where it became a tropical depression. Later, it became a tropical storm. It was named Talim. Talim moved through the South China Sea as it intensified. Near the coast of China, Talim reached its peak intensity as a Category 2-equivalent typhoon. Talim slightly weakened before making landfall in China at 22:20 CST. About six hours later, Talim entered the Gulf of Tonkin and made a second landfall. On July 18, Talim dissipated inland.

On July 19, the JMA began tracking a disturbance in the Philippine Sea. On July 21, the JMA noticed it had begun to become more organized and it was upgraded into a tropical storm, with the name given being Doksuri. The PAGASA also noted the formation and gave it the name Egay. On July 23, the system began to intensify rapidly, and achieved typhoon status. Late on July 24, the JTWC classified it as a super typhoon. The next morning the PAGASA did the same thing as on that day it reached its peak of 1 minute sustained winds of 240 km/h (150 mph). Doksuri began to slow as it reached the northern Philippines. With dry air in the area, Doksuri started to undergo an eyewall replacement cycle. As a mid-range Category-4 typhoon, Doksuri made landfall over Fuga Island in Aparri, Cagayan. Hours later, it made another landfall in Dalupiri Island. The storm eventually began to de-intensify following the eyewall replacement. However, as it exited the region on July 27, it began reintensifying. It was now heading toward Taiwan and China with 1 minute sustained winds of 120 mph. On July 28, it made its last landfall in China; however, it rapidly began to weaken. On July 29, Doksuri dissipated inland over China.

After Doksuri devastated several countries, JMA announced another formation of a low-pressure area in the Pacific Ocean. The JMA later issued a warning, declaring it as a tropical depression. The system also indicated that the system is in a favorable environment for development. On July 27, the JTWC subsequently issued advisories for the system and classified the system as Tropical Depression 06W. Despite its disorganized structure, both agencies upgraded the system into a tropical storm, with JMA assigning the name Khanun.

Khanun later entered the Philippine Area of Responsibility (PAR), gaining the name Falcon by PAGASA. Tracking northward due to a nearby mid-level subtropical high-pressure area, Khanun intensified into a severe tropical storm. Over 24 hours, its maximum sustained wind speeds grew by 130 km/h (80 mph) and eventually reached a peak of 220 km/h (140 mph), equivalent to Category 4 status on the Saffir–Simpson scale. As it left PAR on August 1, Khanun weakened slightly as it moved move closer to the Ryukyu Islands, battering them with heavy rain and strong winds. Khanun weakened further due to an ongoing eyewall replacement cycle, allowing its eye to grow massively, but degrading its overall structure.

Following structural weakening, the JMA and JTWC downgraded Khanun to a severe tropical storm, with estimated winds of 95 km/h (60 mph). After passing north of Tokunoshima, the storm accelerated to the southeast. Satellite imagery showed a consolidating LLCC with formative convective banding and deep convection over the northern semicircle, the storm passed the southwestern island of Kyushu. Around 00:00 UTC on August 10, Khanun made landfall on Geojedo Islands in South Korea with winds of 85 km/h (50 mph). The JMA continued to monitor Khanun as a tropical cyclone until early on August 11.

On August 5, the JMA reported that a low-pressure area had formed east-northeast of Iwo Jima. Environmental conditions were marginally favorable to conduct a tropical cyclogenesis, with warm sea temperatures, low vertical wind shear, and good outflow. Later that day, JMA named the system Lan as it strengthened into a tropical storm. Lan continues to strengthen more to achieve the peak intensity of 220 km/h (140 mph) by JTWC.

After reaching its peak intensity, Lan started to track through colder waters, causing the typhoon to weaken significantly. Lan re-strengthened again into a Category-2 typhoon as it strengthened. The storm maintained its overall convective structure, but the waters beneath the cyclone cooled, prompting a quick weakening trend. Around 14:00 UTC on August 14, Lan made landfall on Cape Shionomisaki, Japan. Once inland, Lan weakened into a tropical storm over the region's rough terrain. Lan began to accelerate northeast through Sea of Japan while weakening. JMA declared the system as an extratropical low on August 17.

In mid-August, two tropical disturbances were formed on either side of the basin. The first disturbance was recognized east of Taiwan on August 20. On the next day, the second one formed in the open waters of the Western Pacific. PAGASA expected that the low-pressure area near Taiwan would have a low chance of development. However, on the next day, PAGASA later recognized that the disturbance was named Goring after it was upgraded into a tropical depression. Meanwhile, in the open waters of the Pacific, JTWC designated the system as Tropical Depression 08W. While near the Philippines, JTWC gave the identifier for Goring as Tropical Depression 09W.

On August 24, 09W was upgraded into a tropical storm, which gave the name Saola by the JMA. Saola began to move southwestwards through the Philippine Sea and continued to intensity to a typhoon. Being in warm sea surface temperature, Saola began to rapidly intensify as it loitered off the coast of Luzon. It reached the intensity of a Category-4 typhoon on August 27. After executing a south-southeastward turn over the Philippine Sea, Saola weakened to a Category-2 typhoon. However, on August 29, Saola regained strength and explosively intensified further into a Category-5 super typhoon. Saola crossed through the Babuyan Islands before it left the Philippine Area of Responsibility a few hours later.

Saola remained a powerful super typhoon as it crossed through the South China Sea, and featured a clear and warm eye as it did so. As it drew closer to Hong Kong, Saola was struggling to complete an eyewall replacement cycle, resulting in some slight weakening. Before its approach, the Hong Kong Observatory had issued its Hurricane Signal No. 10 at 20:15 HKT (12:15 UTC), the first time to do so since Typhoon Mangkhut of 2018. On September 1, Saola passed south of Hong Kong and Macau as a mid-Category-4 typhoon, battering with strong winds and heavy rain. Saola weakened into a Category-3 as it made landfall in Guangdong, China on early Saturday. Once inland, Saola began to weaken into a severe tropical storm after landfall. On September 3, all agencies issued their final advisory as Saola dissipated that day.

In the open waters of the basin, 08W received the name Damrey as it moved northward. Avoiding the Japanese islands, Damrey intensified into a Category-1 typhoon and severe tropical storm, respectively by the JTWC and JMA, well east of Japan. It then turned post-tropical on August 29.

While Saola is exhibiting a counter-clockwise loop east of the Philippines, a new broad low-pressure area developed into a tropical depression on August 27, near the Northern Mariana Islands, while slowly drifting westward. On the next day, JMA immediately named the disturbance as Haikui. The JTWC began issuing advisories for Haikui thereafter and designated it as Tropical Depression 10W. Shortly after being named, Haikui rapidly intensified into a severe tropical storm status a few minutes later. It eventually entered PAR, giving the domestic name Hanna.

Before landfall in Taiwan, Haikui strengthened into a Category-3 typhoon due to favorable conditions. Haikui then made landfall, in Taitung County, Taiwan on September 3, became the first typhoon to make landfall in that intensity since Typhoon Megi of 2016. The mountain ranges of Taiwan made it weakened to a Category-1 typhoon. It then moved erratically and made its second landfall in Kaohsiung, Taiwan. Haikui weakened significantly and downgraded into a severe tropical storm. On September 5, Haikui made its third and final landfall in Dongshan County, Fujian as a weakening tropical storm. Therefore, JMA and the JTWC made their final advisory as Haikui dissipated on the next day. Overall, Haikui caused 16 deaths and a total of US$2.31 billion worth of damages throughout its lifetime.

Just after Haikui strengthened into a tropical storm, another low-pressure area located far east of Guam began to form. On August 30, as the system steadily intensified, the JTWC started issuing advisories and designated the depression as Tropical Depression 11W. While moving northwest, 11W developed into a tropical storm, giving the name Kirogi. On September 2, Kirogi weakened back to a tropical depression. Its remnants would meander near Japan before dissipating on September 6.

On September 4, an area of low pressure was formed in the northeast region of PAR. The LPA would later be named Ineng by PAGASA and Yun-yeung which replaced the name Kai-tak. Yun-yeung continued to move northward slowly as it approached central and eastern Japan. Yun-yeung was last noted over Suruga Bay near Shizuoka, Japan. It brought heavy rain across the wide areas of Japan, prompting warnings over the risk of flooding and mudslides.

An area of low pressure formed near the Southern Philippines. On September 24, JMA recognized it as a tropical depression as it tracked westward. Around the same day, JTWC designated the system as 13W. It was tracking north-northwestward toward the Vietnam coast. The JMA last tracked the system on September 27.

On September 27, a low-pressure area was formed near the Northern Mariana Islands. The JTWC later issued bulletins for any potential development in the upcoming days. It continued to move westwards, entering PAR where it was upgraded into a depression and named Jenny by PAGASA. A few hours later, JTWC gave the identifier for Jenny as Tropical Depression 14W. On the next day, JMA upgraded 14W into a tropical storm, assigning the name Koinu. Koinu moved west-northwestward while it intensified steadily. Being in the warm waters of the Philippine Sea, Koinu was upgraded into a Category-3 typhoon.

Koinu weakened into a Category 2 yet it reintensified further into a Category-4 typhoon with 1-minute sustained winds of 220 km/h (140 mph) and a central pressure of 940 hPa (27.76 inHg). This caused Koinu to perform an eyewall replacement cycle, achieving its defined eye-like feature. Koinu then passed dangerously to Lanyu before making its first landfall in Hengchun, Taiwan.

After its interaction with land, Koinu weakened again, downgrading to Category-3 strength. As it left PAR, Koinu further weakened into a Category-1 typhoon. As it tracked through the South China Sea, Koinu unexpectedly restrengthened back to Category-3 major typhoon for the second time. Koinu later passed closely to Hong Kong, which prompted the HKO to issue Increasing Storm Signal No. 9 at 19:00 (HKT). It was kept for 4 hours as it moved away from the country. As it moves through unfavorable conditions, Koinu starts to weaken again for the last time to a tropical storm. JMA and JTWC ceased advisories as Koinu dissipated over the coastal waters of Guangdong on October 10.

A tropical depression was formed near the Federated States of Micronesia on October 6. The depression later gave its identifier from JTWC as Tropical Depression 15W. Although it was disorganized, the system continued to consolidate, and was upgraded into Tropical Storm Bolaven. On October 10, Bolaven was upgraded into a typhoon. The typhoon passed just south of Saipan and the Northern Mariana Islands. Bolaven later underwent explosive intensification in which it went from a 150 km/h (90 mph) Category 1-equivalent typhoon to a 260 km/h (160 mph) Category 5-equivalent super typhoon in 12 hours ending at 00:00 UTC on October 11, after leaving the Mariana Islands. However, shortly after peaking its intensity, Bolaven later weakened as it recurved northeastward. Bolaven then transitioned into an extratropical cyclone which prompted the JTWC to cease their bulletins.

On October 13, a low-pressure area developed to the west of the Philippines. Due to the system being over warm waters and low vertical wind shear, a TCFA was announced on October 16. JTWC designated the said disturbance as 16W. On October 18, JMA formally named the system Tropical Storm Sanba as it continues to consolidate. Sanba later made landfall in Hainan on the following day. It weakened into a tropical depression on October 20.

After many weeks of inactivity, a tropical depression was formed on November 12. Shortly after, the JTWC issued a TCFA for what was then-Invest 95W. At 15:00 UTC, the agency designated it as 17W. The system was expected to develop into a tropical cyclone but was hindered by easterly wind shear and dry air. On the following day, the JTWC noted that 17W had been dissipated due to the presence of high wind shear as it headed towards the equator.

The last tropical cyclone of 2023 was formed east-southeast of Yap on December 13. Conditions for further development remained marginally conductive with sea surface temperatures of 30–31 °C (86–88 °F) and low vertical wind shear. The next day, it entered PAR, which gained the name Kabayan. On December 17, the system intensified into a tropical storm, and attained the name Jelawat. At 09:30 PHT (01:30 UTC) the next day, Jelawat made landfall in Manay, Davao Oriental, weakening into a tropical depression. JTWC later issued its last bulletin on Jelawat, stating that land interaction and lack of humidity had made the depression rapidly weaken.

However, on December 20, JMA and JTWC monitored the remnants of the system, stating that it was marginal to regenerate. The JMA continued to observe the remnants until 18:00 UTC. The JTWC remained monitoring the remnants until they formally dissipated on December 22. Jelawat's passage through the Philippines caused heavy rainfall across Mindanao and Visayas. One person went missing while the other one got injured. Jelawat caused $43,200 thousand worth of damages throughout its onslaught.

=== North Indian Ocean ===
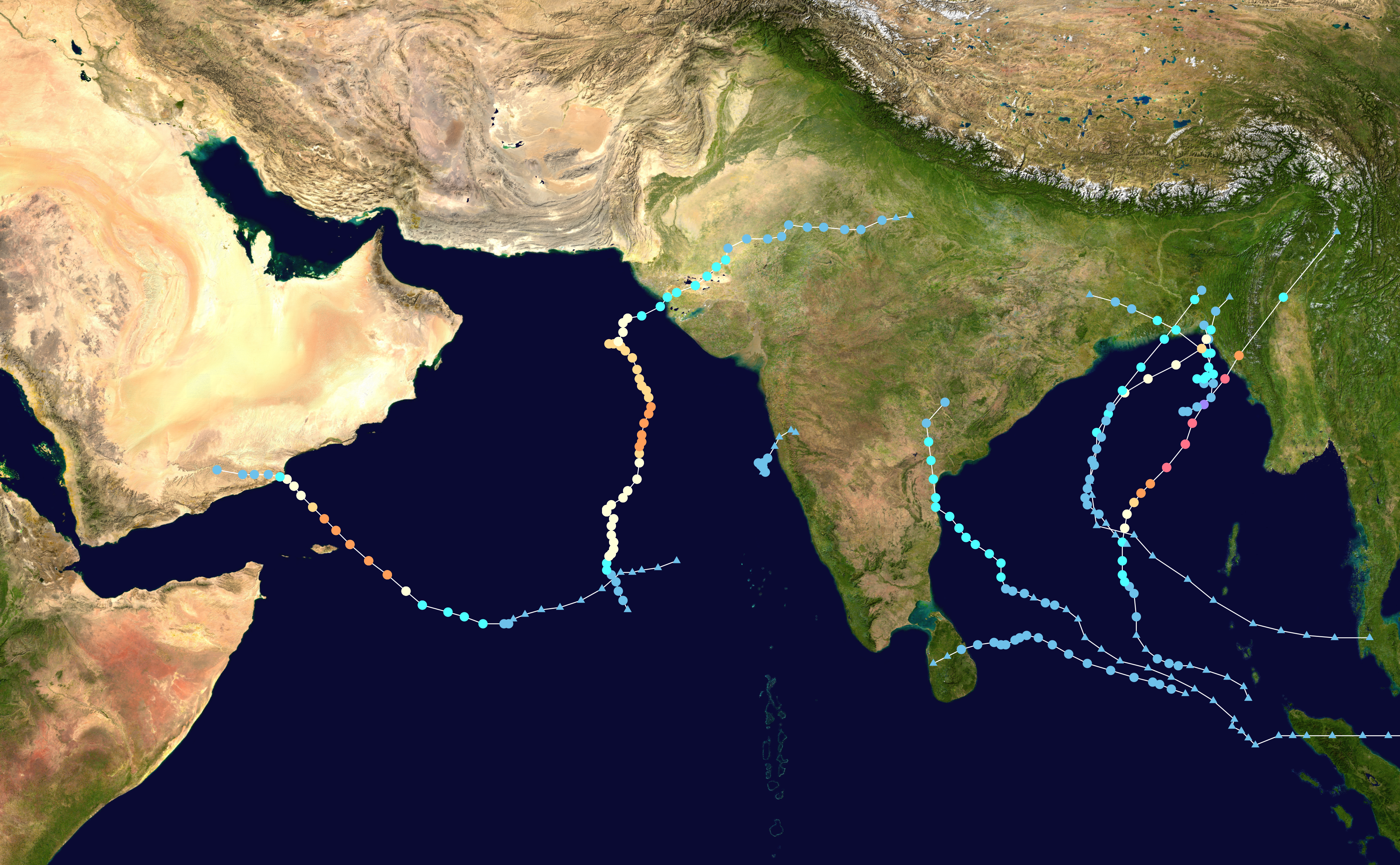
2023 North Indian Ocean cyclone season summary map

The season began on January 30 with the formation of a tropical depression classified as BOB 01 over the Bay of Bengal. The storm's formation was the first January tropical cyclone in the basin since 2019. The JTWC later issued a TCFA on the system, designated as Invest 90B. It weakened after continued land interaction with Sri Lanka.

After almost four months of inactivity, the IMD began to monitor a disturbance which was located in the Bay of Bengal on May 6. The system steadily improved and was upgraded to a depression by the IMD, classified as BOB 02. Soon afterward on May 10, it intensified to a deep depression. On the next day, it strengthened into a cyclonic storm; with the IMD assigning the name Mocha. Mocha began to rapidly intensify and reached its peak intensity as a Category 5-equivalent cyclone on May 14. Mocha then made landfall just north of Sittwe, Myanmar as a high-end Category 4-equivalent cyclone. The cyclone then rapidly weakened and was last noted over the Chinese province of Yunnan on May 15. Mocha caused heavy damage across Myanmar and Bangladesh. The storm left 400 people dead. On June 1, the IMD monitored a disturbance in the Arabian Sea and was later upgraded to a cyclonic storm on June 6, receiving the name Biparjoy. The system quickly intensified to Category 1-equivalent strength. However, moderate easterly wind shear limited Biparjoy's intensification for a while. Later on, the cyclone unexpectedly rapidly intensified and reached its peak as a Category 3-equivalent cyclone. Afterward, wind shear began to take a toll on Biparjoy and made landfall near Naliya, India. The brown ocean effect caused the cyclone to gradually weaken and was finally downgraded to a well-marked low-pressure area by the IMD on June 19. Meanwhile, in the Bay of Bengal, a low-pressure area formed on June 9, and the JTWC designated it Tropical Cyclone 03B with sheared yet organized convection. On June 10, the system weakened to a low-pressure area over Bangladesh and dissipated. On July 31, both the IMD and JTWC began tracking a new area of low pressure in the northeastern part of the Bay of Bengal. Later that day, JTWC upgraded the system to Tropical Cyclone 04B. IMD designated it as Deep Depression BOB 03 and later made landfall in Khepupara before dissipating in Eastern India. On September 30, IMD designated Depression ARB 02 off the Konkan coast. The system maintained its intensity before moving inland the next day. In late October, two major cyclones occurred, namely Tej and Hamoon. Tej developed in a favorable environment of high sea surface temperatures and low wind shear. Thus, the system rapidly intensified to a high-end Category 3-equivalent cyclone according to the JTWC. Afterward, dry air caused Tej to steadily weaken before making landfall in Al Mahrah Governorate, Yemen. Hamoon was named in the Bay of Bengal on October 23. Overnight, the system rapidly intensified to a Category 2-equivalent cyclone, and later made landfall on Bangladesh's coast. In middle of November, a low pressure area was formed which later intensified into a depression according by IMD. This system rapidly strengthened into a cyclonic storm, named Midhili, and on November 17, it made landfall near the coast of Bangladesh. After that, in late November, a low pressure area occurred near Gulf of Thailand and later it upgraded into a deep depression on December 2. It developed into a cyclonic storm thereafter and was named Michaung. It further rapidly intensified into a high-end severe cyclonic storm with maximum sustained winds of 110 km/h (70 mph). On December 5, it made landfall near Bapatla in Andhra Pradesh. The storm killed at least seventeen people.

=== South-West Indian Ocean ===
==== January – June ====
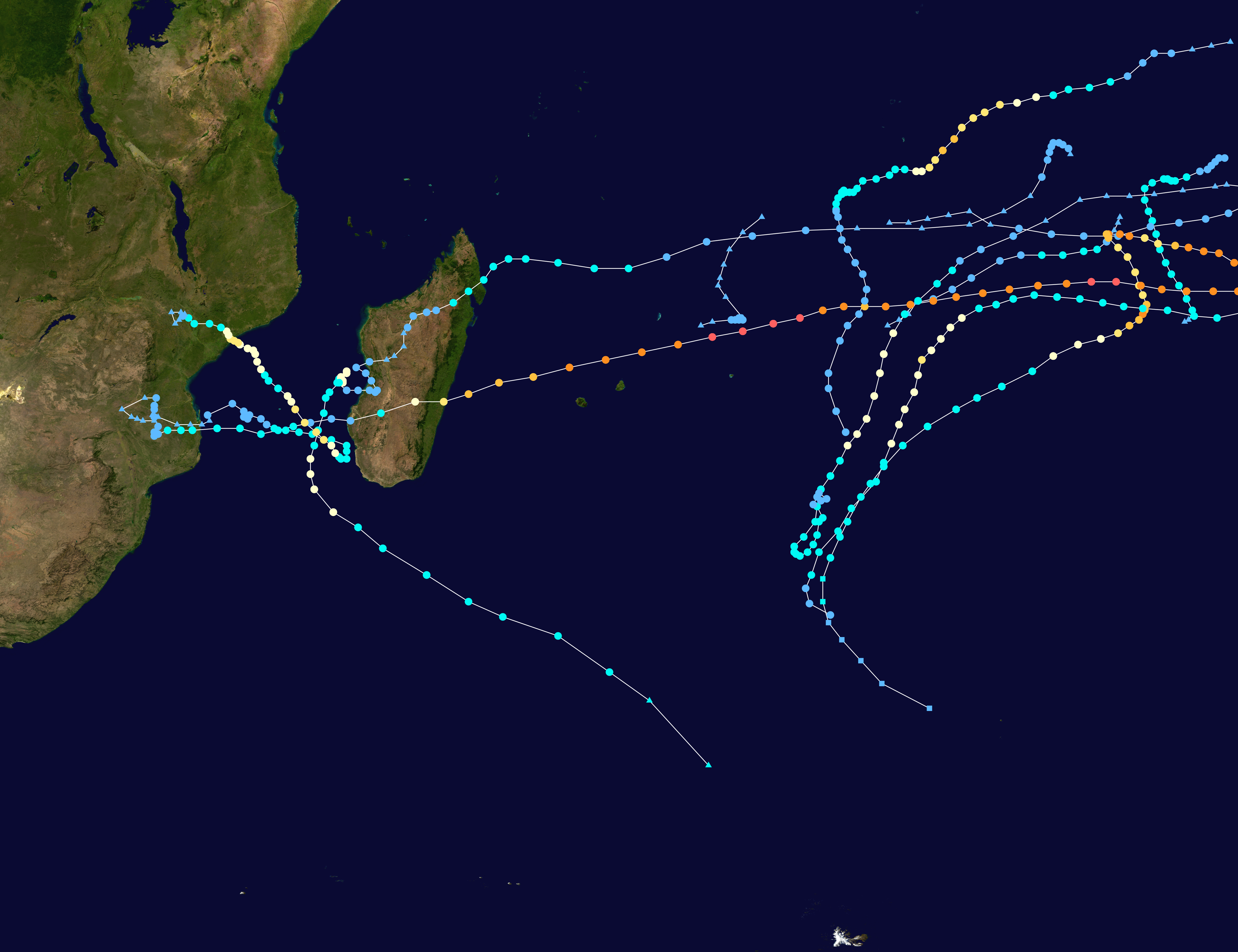
2022–2023 South-West Indian Ocean cyclone season summary map

In January 2023, a new disturbance became a tropical depression and was later named Cheneso. The cyclone strengthened to severe tropical storm status before making landfall over Madagascar on January 19. It re-intensified to Cyclone Cheneso after moving southwestwards as an overland depression status. It was last noted as a subtropical depression on January 29. In February 2023, Tropical Low 11U from the Australian region moved into this basin, where it was classified as Moderate Tropical Storm Dingani. Although initially struggling to intensify due to wind shear, it gradually intensified and eventually reached tropical cyclone status, before moving southwestwards and dissipated.

Cyclone Freddy moved the Australian area and reached this region, where MFR immediately classed it as a tropical cyclone status. It subsequently strengthened into a very intense tropical cyclone status. Freddy later intensified into a Category 5 tropical cyclone before making landfall over Madagascar. It weakened as it crossed the Mozambique Channel, but it re-intensified to severe tropical storm status before making landfall in Mozambique, it unexpectedly reappeared in the Mozambique Channel. It was upgraded to tropical cyclone status. It weakened but began to re-strengthen when it approached Mozambique, the storm gradually deteriorated and last noted on March 14. Another tropical depression formed and strengthened into Moderate Tropical Storm Enala, which subsequently evolved into a tropical cyclone and last occurred on February 28. Another period of inactivity then ensued, until a Moderate Tropical Storm 09 formed and dissipated quickly. In May, Fabien formed close to the equator and became an intense tropical cyclone, which was unusually strong this late in the season before encountering increasing wind shear.

==== July – December ====
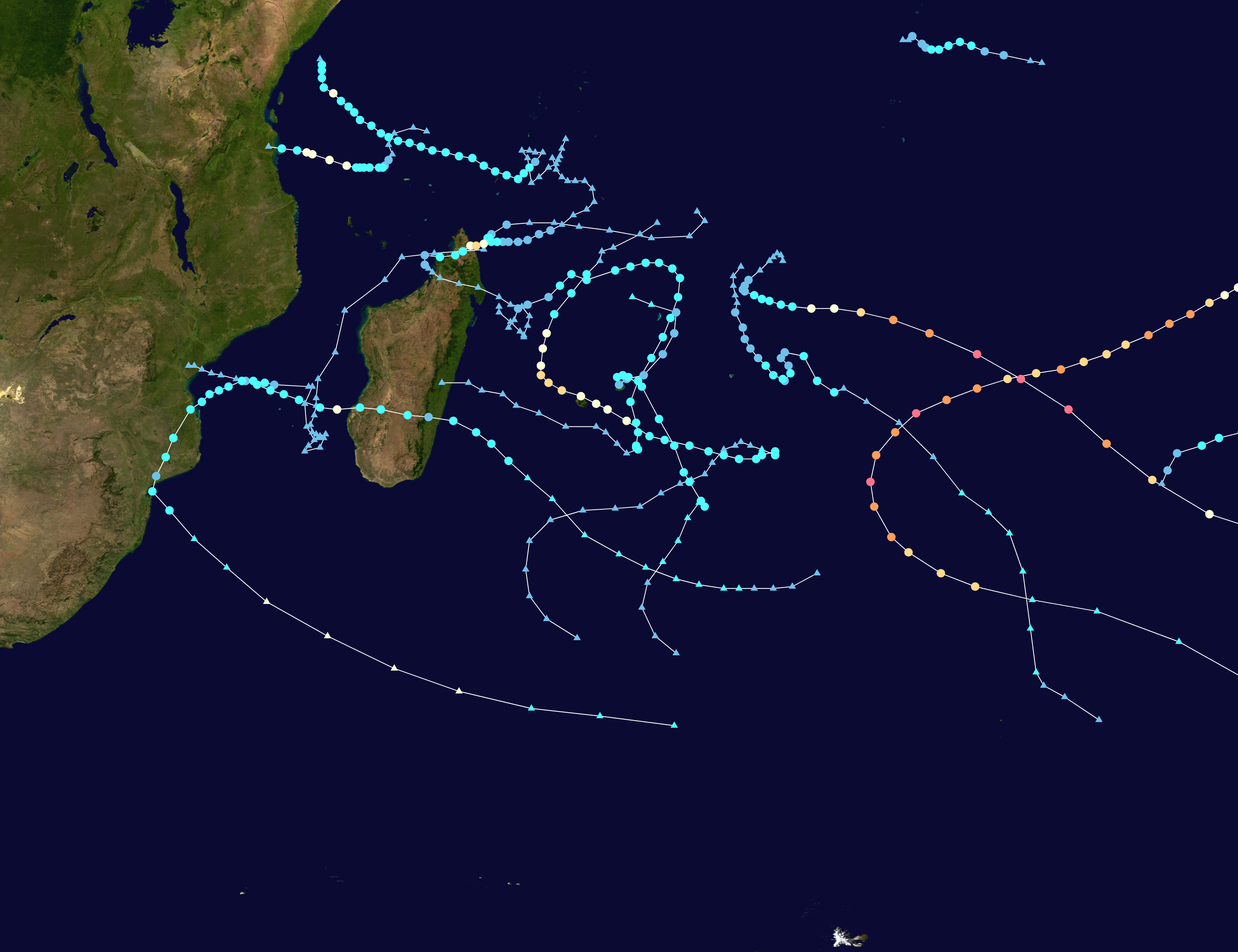
2023–24 South-West Indian Ocean cyclone season summary map

The season began with Tropical Storm Alvaro on December 30. The next day, it traversed the Mozambique Channel before being upgraded to a moderate tropical storm. It persisted into January 2024. A few days later, a disturbance would form.

=== Australian region ===
==== January – June ====
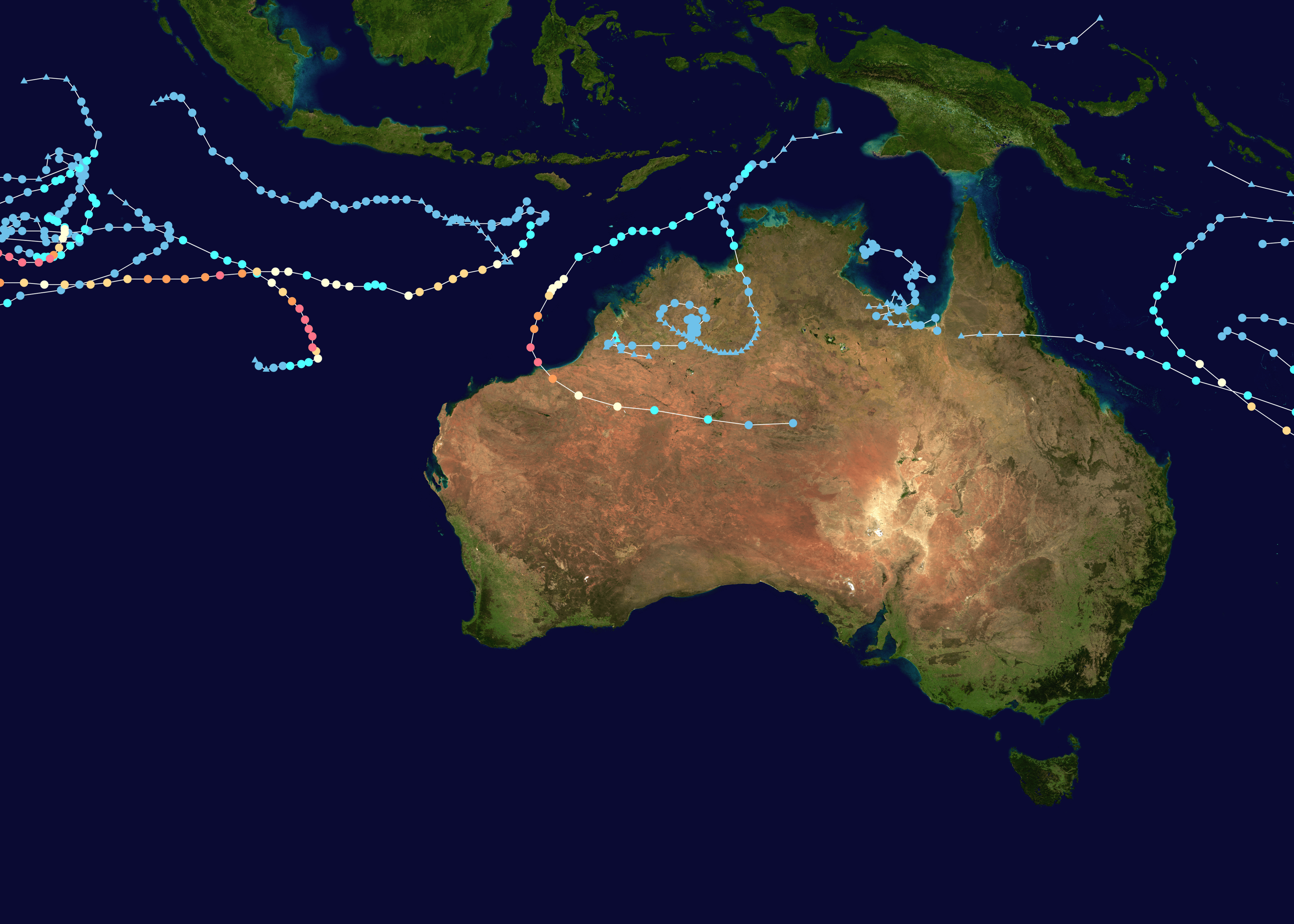
2022–2023 Australian region cyclone season summary map

The season began with Cyclone Ellie, which persisted into 2023. Ellie dissipated on January 8, ending its long duration over the Australian mainland. On January 6, Tropical Low 07U formed over the Coral Sea, becoming the first storm to form in the basin. 07U entered the South Pacific basin on the next day, where it was named Hale by the FMS. Tropical Disturbance 05F formed on January 14 by the FMS, while it was still in the Australian basin. It briefly moved into the South Pacific basin and re-entered into the Australian basin. It later moved back into the South Pacific Basin. On January 18, a tropical low formed. The JTWC issued a TCFA on the system as it crossed into the South Pacific basin. It was later identified as 06F (10P from JTWC) and was dissipated on January 21 with vertical wind shear in South Pacific Ocean. On January 22, a tropical low classified as 10U by the BoM formed from a monsoon trough over the Arafura Sea, which generally headed westward after formation. It dissipated on January 26. On January 27, the BoM noted that a tropical low formed in the central Indian Ocean and classified it as 11U. The JTWC designated the system as Invest 94S, and began to consolidate. Another tropical low formed in the central Indian Ocean being classified as 12U by the BoM and Invest 95S by the JTWC, which dissipated on February 5.

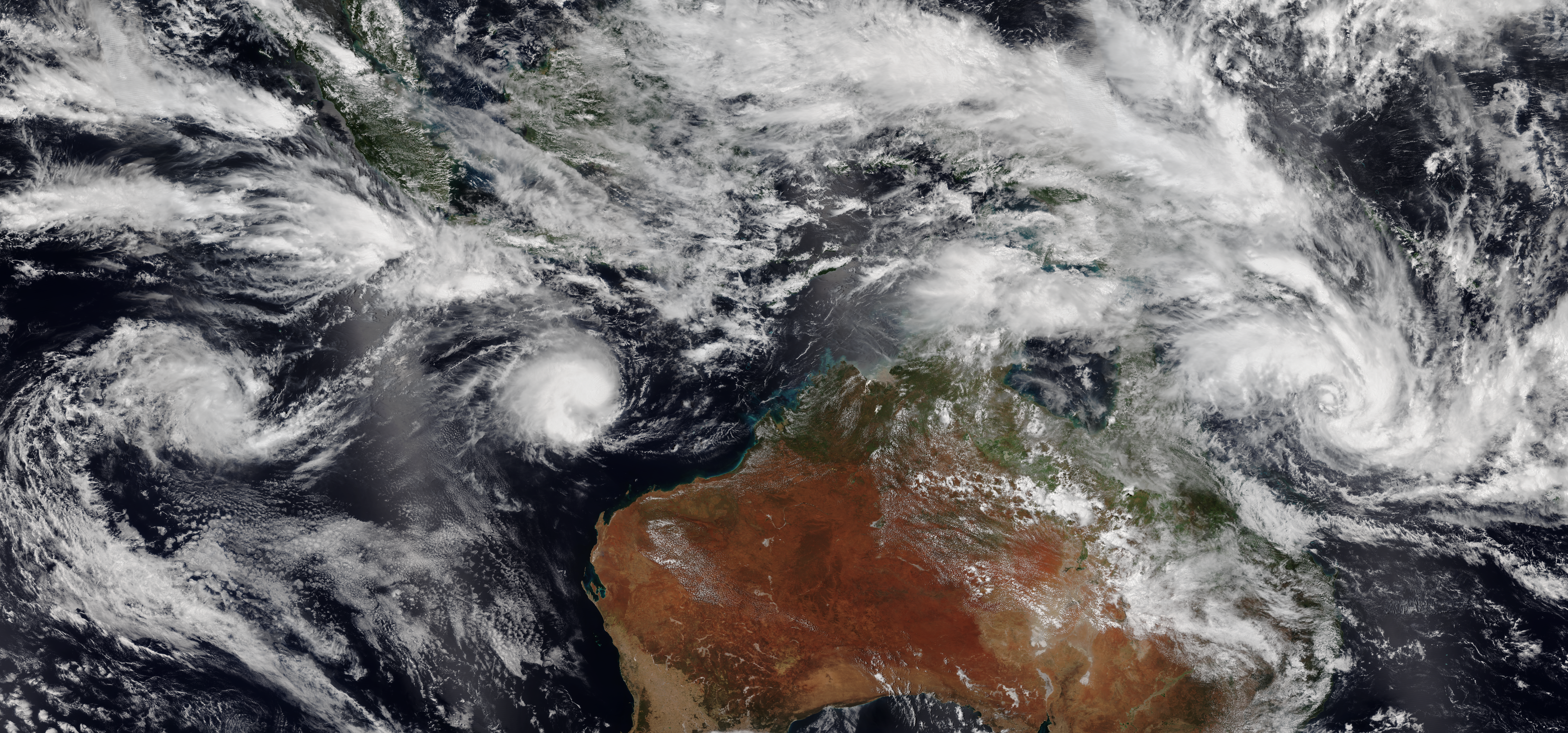
Three tropical cyclones active on February 8: Tropical Low 11U; which would later become Cyclone Dingani (left), Cyclone Freddy (middle left) and Cyclone Gabrielle (right)

The same day, another tropical low classified as 13U by the BoM and 97S by the JTWC formed northeast of 12U, and began to consolidate. 13U intensified into a Category 1 tropical cyclone, henceforth being assigned the name Freddy. Tropical Low 14U formed south of the Solomon Islands, also being tracked by the JTWC, by the code identifier 99P. Freddy intensified into a Category 3 on the Australian scale, and 14U became the fifth named storm of 2023 as it became a Category 1 on the Australian scale, henceforth being assigned the name Gabrielle. Tropical Low 11U moved into the Southwest Indian Ocean basin on February 9, where it was assigned the name Dingani. Freddy weakened into a category two tropical cyclone before intensifying again. Gabrielle moved into the South Pacific basin as a Category 3 severe tropical cyclone on February 10. Freddy reached Category 4 on both the Australian scale and the SSHWS. Tropical Low 15U formed in the Gulf of Carpentaria on February 11. Freddy, after weakening slightly, moved into the South-west Indian Ocean basin on February 14. 15U was last noted on February 17. On February 23, the BoM reported that 16U had formed to the north of the coast of Pilbara, later moving into the Gulf of Carpentaria before moving inland. 17U, a weak tropical low, formed over land to the south of the Joseph Bonaparte Gulf on February 24. Another weak tropical low formed on February 26, classified as 18U by the BoM. 18U moved into the South Pacific basin on March 1. 17U, meanwhile, was last noted on February 27.

On March 28, Tropical Low 21U formed near the coast of Cocos Kelling Islands, a day later it intensified giving it the name Herman, a few days later it intensified into a Category 5 severe tropical cyclone. However, it started to rapidly deteriorate down to a tropical low within 48 hours after its peak. A week later on April 6, the BoM noted a tropical low forming in the Timor Sea. It gradually intensified as it moved southwest before being designated Topical Low 23U. The storm rapidly improved and was upgraded to a Category 1 tropical cyclone by the BoM, naming the system Ilsa. Ilsa went along the coast of Western Australia while steadily intensifying to a Category 3 severe tropical cyclone on April 12. Ilsa gradually tracked southwest before turning to the southeast where it further intensified to a Category 5 severe tropical cyclone. One minute sustained winds of 260 km/h (160 mph) were estimated by the JTWC, making the system equivalent to a Category 5 hurricane on the SSHWS. The BoM also monitored record breaking ten-minute sustained winds of 218 km/h (135 mph) in Bedout Island, beating the previous record of Cyclone George in 2007. In the late hours of April 13, Ilsa made landfall east of Port Hedland. Ilsa rapidly weakened while inland, degenerated into a low, and dissipated on April 16. On April 30, the BoM noted a weak tropical low south of Christmas Island.

==== July – December ====
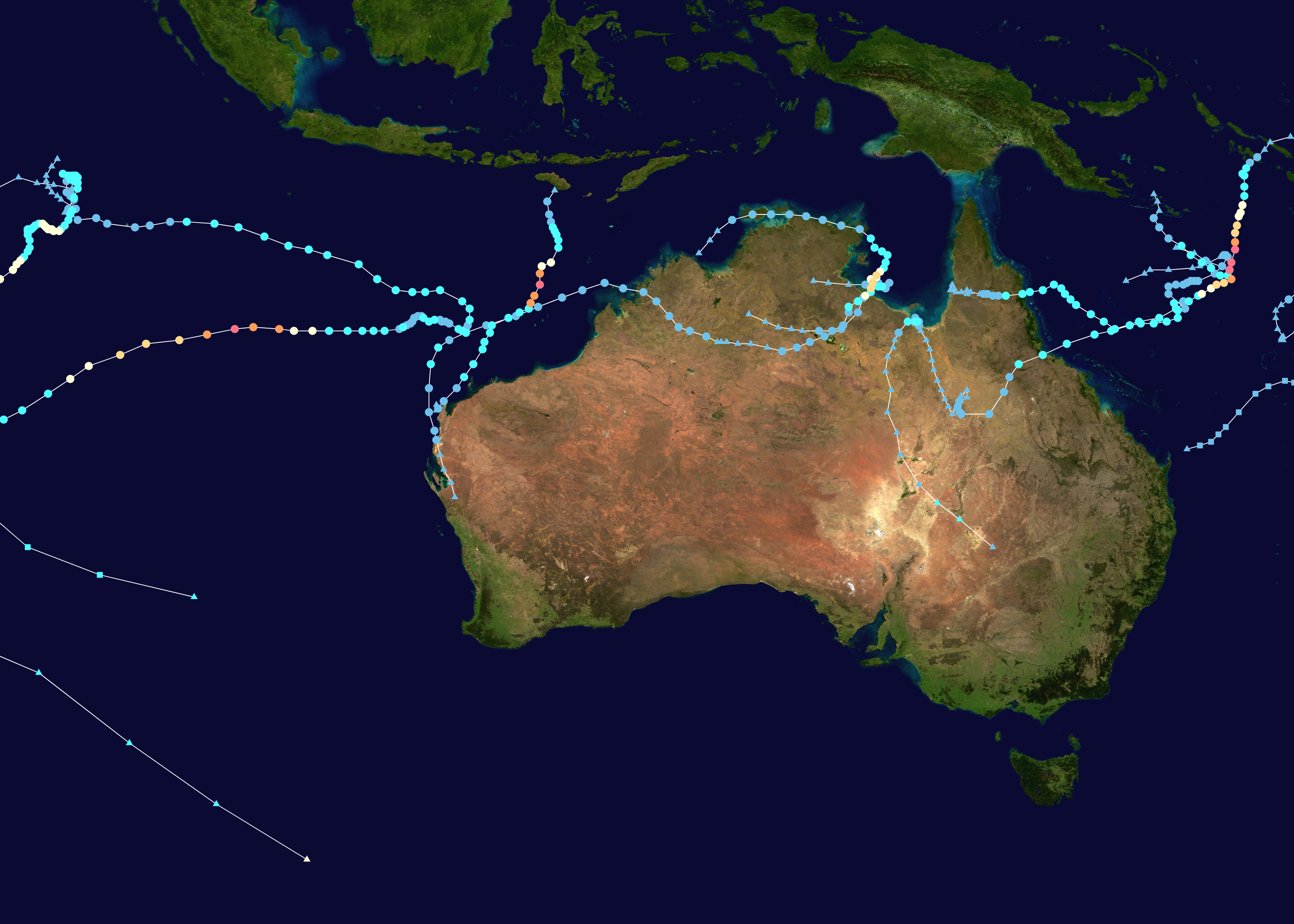
2023–24 Australian region cyclone season summary map

The season officially began on November 1, however, the first system, Cyclone Jasper, would not be active until more than a month later, when it entered the basin as a tropical low. The low would become a named storm on December 5, receiving the name Jasper, and would intensify into the season's first severe tropical cyclone the next day. After a brief lull in activity, 03U would form, causing flooding in Western Australia and Northern Territory. Followed with 03U, Tropical Storm Anggrek would form. It would peak as a Category 3 tropical cyclone on the Australian scale, equivalent to a Category 1 hurricane on the Saffir-Simpson hurricane wind scale, and later would become an intense cyclone. Anggrek exited the basin on January 25, continuing its trek in the Southwest Indian Ocean. While Anggrek would continue its trek, Tropical Storm Kirilly would form, peaking as a minimal severe tropical cyclone before making landfall on Queensland.

=== South Pacific Ocean ===
==== January – June ====
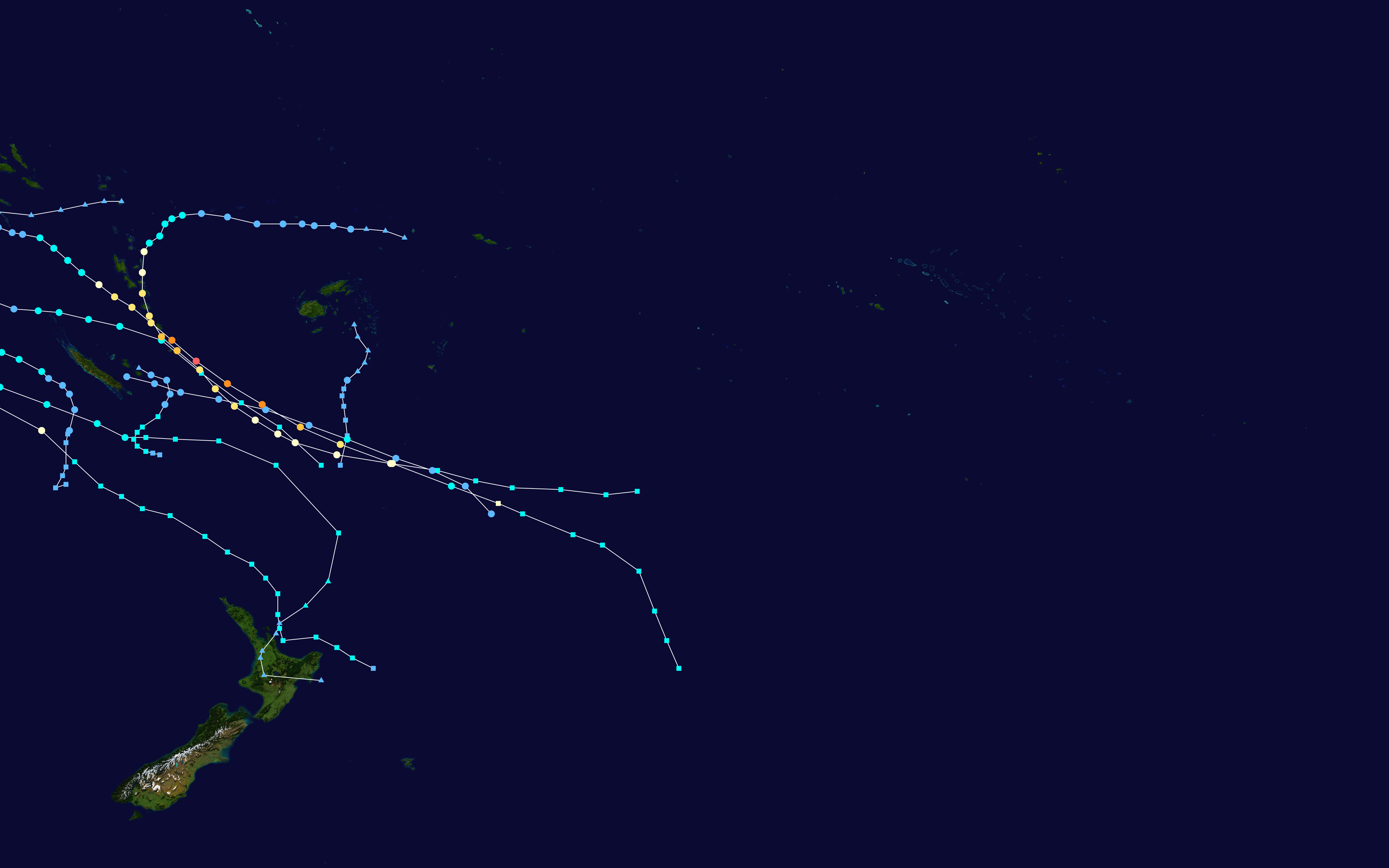
2022–2023 South Pacific cyclone season summary map

On January 5, a tropical disturbance which was designated as 03F formed near New Caledonia, becoming the first system to form in 2023. 03F dissipated two days later as it was in close proximity with nearby Cyclone Hale. On January 7, Tropical Low 07U entered the basin from the Australian region, where it was reclassified as 04F. On the same day, the system strengthened into a Category 1 cyclone and was named Hale by the FMS. Hale struggled to intensify further due to moderate wind shear and became an extratropical cyclone as it approached New Zealand. Hale caused widespread flooding and slips in the northern and eastern parts of the country however, no fatalities were reported. Tropical Disturbance 05F formed on January 14 by the FMS, while it was still in the Australian basin. It briefly moved into the South Pacific basin and re-entered into the Australian basin. It later moved back into the South Pacific basin. After re-entering into the basin, the JTWC had upgraded the system to Cyclone 09P, and the FMS named the system Irene, as the system had reached tropical storm intensity. It began subtropical transition and completed it on January 19, in which the JTWC issued their final warning on the system. The tropical low that had formed in the Australian region on January 18 crossed over into the South Pacific basin, where the JTWC kept up its TCFA on the system. The FMS classified the system as Tropical Depression 06F. The system dissipated on January 22, before its remnants reached New Zealand on January 27.

Severe Tropical Cyclone Gabrielle moved into the South Pacific basin on February 10. It reached peak intensity in this basin as a Category 3 severe tropical cyclone on the Australian scale, and later made landfall on Norfolk Island as a Category 2 tropical cyclone, and subsequently became subtropical, prompting the BoM and the JTWC to cease advisories, however the JTWC was still tracking it as Subtropical Storm 12P when it impacted New Zealand. It eventually became fully extratropical and the JTWC stopped tracking the system. Tropical Disturbance 08F formed just south of Samoa on February 23. It later intensified into a Category 1 tropical cyclone, hence being assigned the name Judy. It later intensified into a Category 4 severe tropical cyclone. On March 5 it became extratropical. On February 27 the Bureau of Meteorology (BoM) had started tracking Tropical Low 18U on the Australian Region then it entered the South Pacific Basin where it intensified into a Category 1 tropical cyclone given the name Kevin. It rapidly intensified into a Category 5 tropical cyclone just south-east of Vanuatu. It weakened to an extratropical cyclone on March 5. Both Judy and Kevin were major tropical cyclones when they struck Vanuatu only 48 hours apart from each other. Tropical Disturbance 10F formed on March 9 near Niue. On March 11, 11F formed to the west of Tonga, with 12F forming a bit after to the northeast of Vanuatu. Neither of the three systems developed further, with the three dissipating on March 13, 23 and 21, respectively. On April 15, a weak tropical low from the Australian Region moved into the South Pacific Basin, being designated as Tropical Disturbance 13F. However, it did not develop further and became extratropical on April 18.

On March 7, SENAMHI reported an "unorganized tropical cyclone" in the Peruvian Sea. They dubbed the unofficial system as Cyclone Yaku. It dissipated on March 20. The system destroyed thousands of homes in Peru and killed eight people.

==== July – December ====
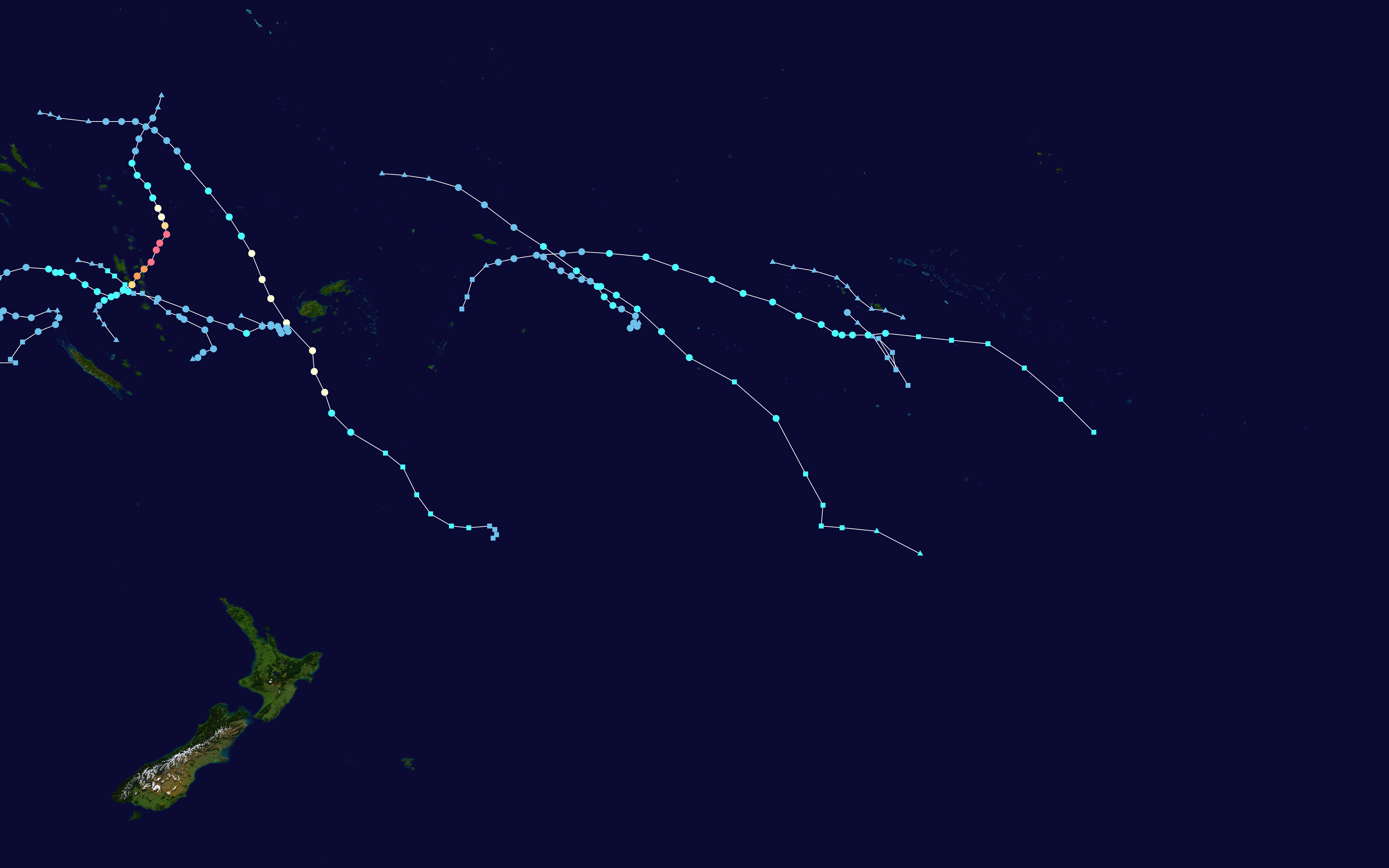
2023–24 South Pacific cyclone season summary map

On October 19, the Fiji Meteorological Service (FMS) reported that Tropical Disturbance 01F had developed out of an area of low pressure, about 1295 km (805 mi) to the northeast of Honiara in the Solomon Islands. At this time the system located in an area favourable for further development, with warm sea-surface temperatures of 30–31 °C (86–88 °F) and low to moderate vertical windshear. Over the next couple of days, the system gradually moved southwestward before the FMS classified it as a tropical depression. The cyclone drifted southward until an upper-level ridge forced the storm to the south. During the next day, it intensified into a Category 1 tropical cyclone, with the FMS naming it as Lola. Lola rapidly intensified into a Category 4 intensity was reached by 12:00 UTC that day, with Lola exhibiting maximum ten-minute sustained winds of 175 km/h (110 mph). With convective rain bands wrapping into the circulation, the JTWC assessed Lola as having one-minute sustained winds of 215 km/h (130 mph). At the same time, the FMS followed suit and upgraded the system to a Category 5 severe tropical cyclone. Lola's eye quickly disappeared, signaling a phase of rapid weakening. Lola made landfall in Sowan, at around 03:00 UTC on October 25. During October 26, Lola degenerated into a tropical depression, before it was last noted the next day and the JTWC issued their final advisory on the storm.

After Lola dissipated, no systems formed until November 11, when the FMS reported that Tropical Disturbance 02F had formed near the Solomon Islands and moved towards Fiji. Although the disturbance was disorganized, it underwent further development due to warm sea surface temperatures and low to moderate vertical wind shear. By November 12, the system intensified into a tropical depression. Persistent deep convection caused the depression to organize as rainbands circulated around it center. It intensified into a Category 1 tropical cyclone later on November 13, with the FMS naming it Mal. Mal continued to strengthen over the favorable conditions as well as high ocean heat content. Hot towers also rose around the center of the storm, a sign of consolidation. On November 14, it intensified into a Category 2 tropical cyclone. As the storm continued to move southeast by the southwest edge of a subtropical ridge, Mal strengthened into a Category 3 severe tropical cyclone at 12:00 UTC of the same day. On November 15, it began to weaken as it entered an environment of high wind shear. It later entered the New Zealand MetService's area of responsibility, where it was reclassified as an ex-tropical cyclone.

=== South Atlantic Ocean ===
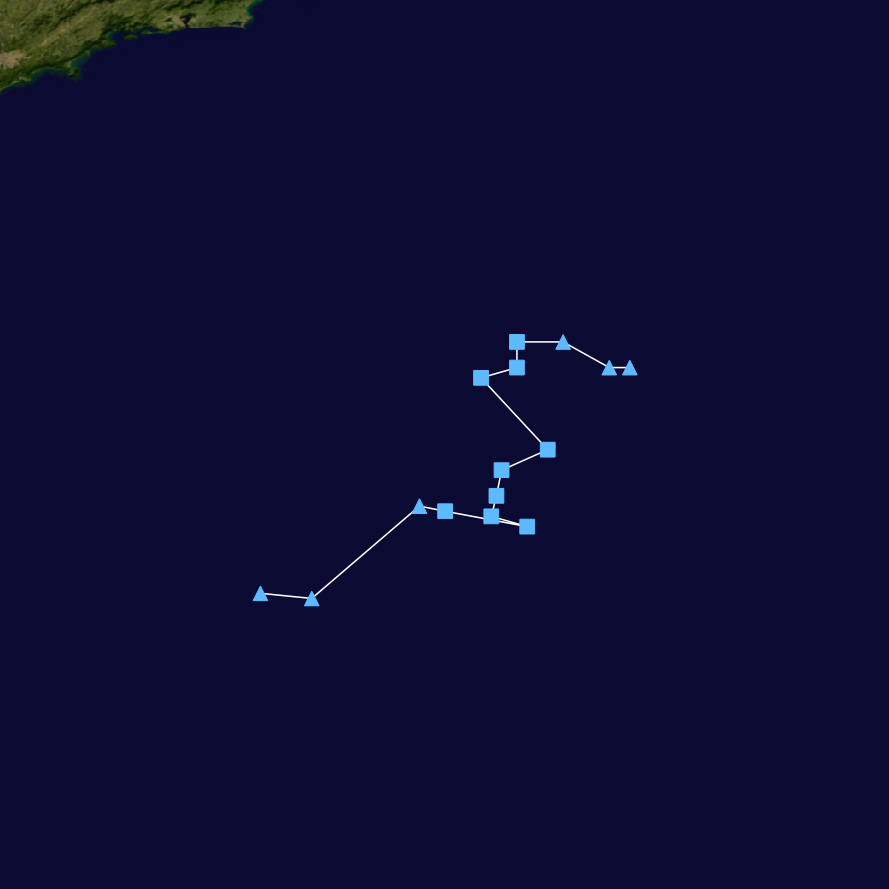
Track map of Subtropical Depression #01-2023, the only tropical/subtropical system to form in the South Atlantic in 2023

On January 7, a subtropical depression formed about 500 km (310 mi) southeast of Rio de Janeiro. Without affecting any area and moving away from the Brazilian coast, it lost its subtropical characteristics in the afternoon of January 10, according to the Brazilian Navy Hydrography Center.

=== Mediterranean Sea ===
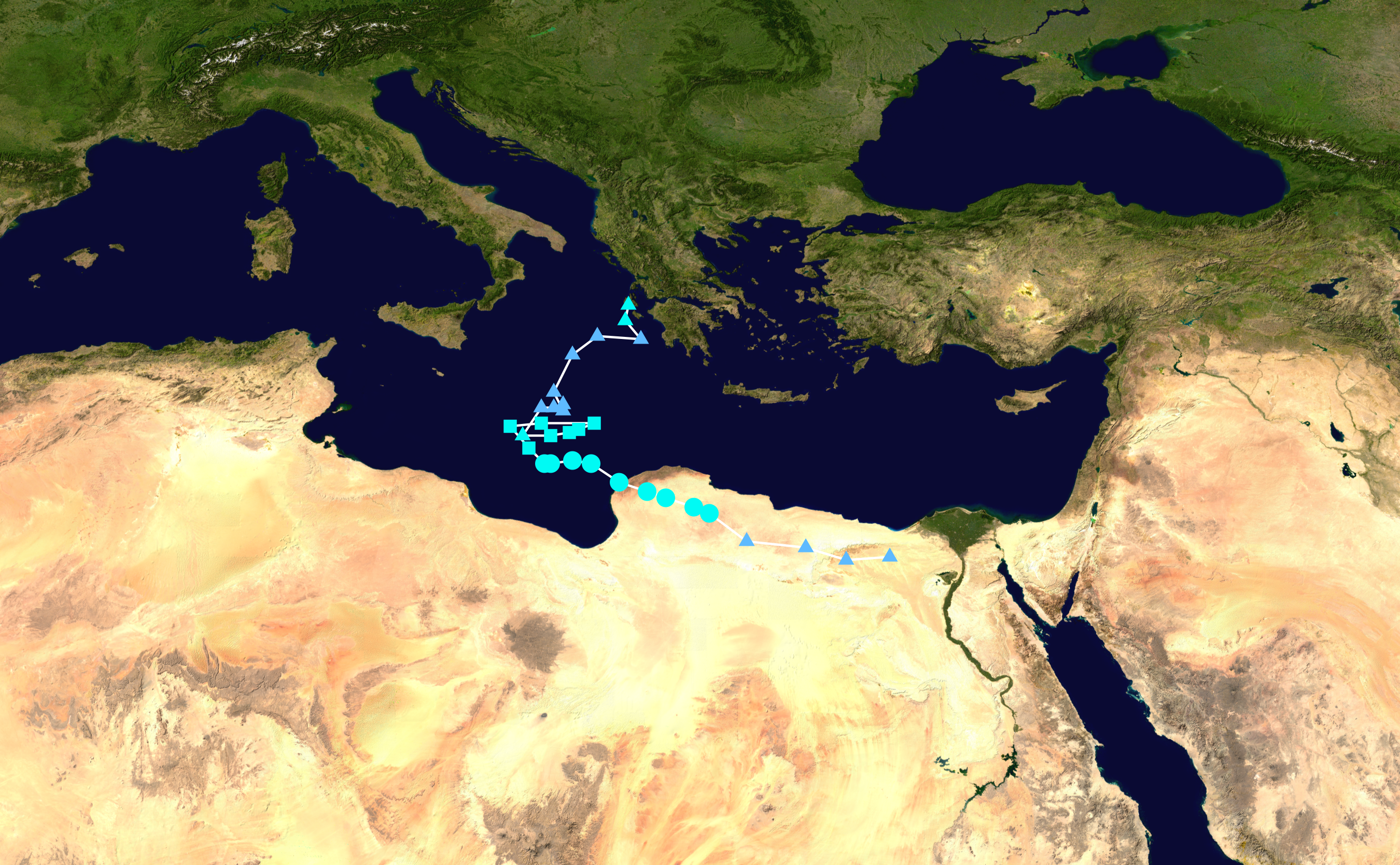
Track map of Storm Daniel, the only tropical/subtropical system to form in the Mediterranean Sea in 2023

On September 9, Storm Daniel transitioned into a Mediterranean tropical-like cyclone in the Ionian Sea. It brought heavy rain and flooding to Greece, especially Thessaly region, before tracking south and making landfall in Libya on September 10. Daniel caused catastrophic flooding across the country, especially in the city of Derna, where two dams failed and killed at least 4,000 people.

== Systems ==
=== January ===
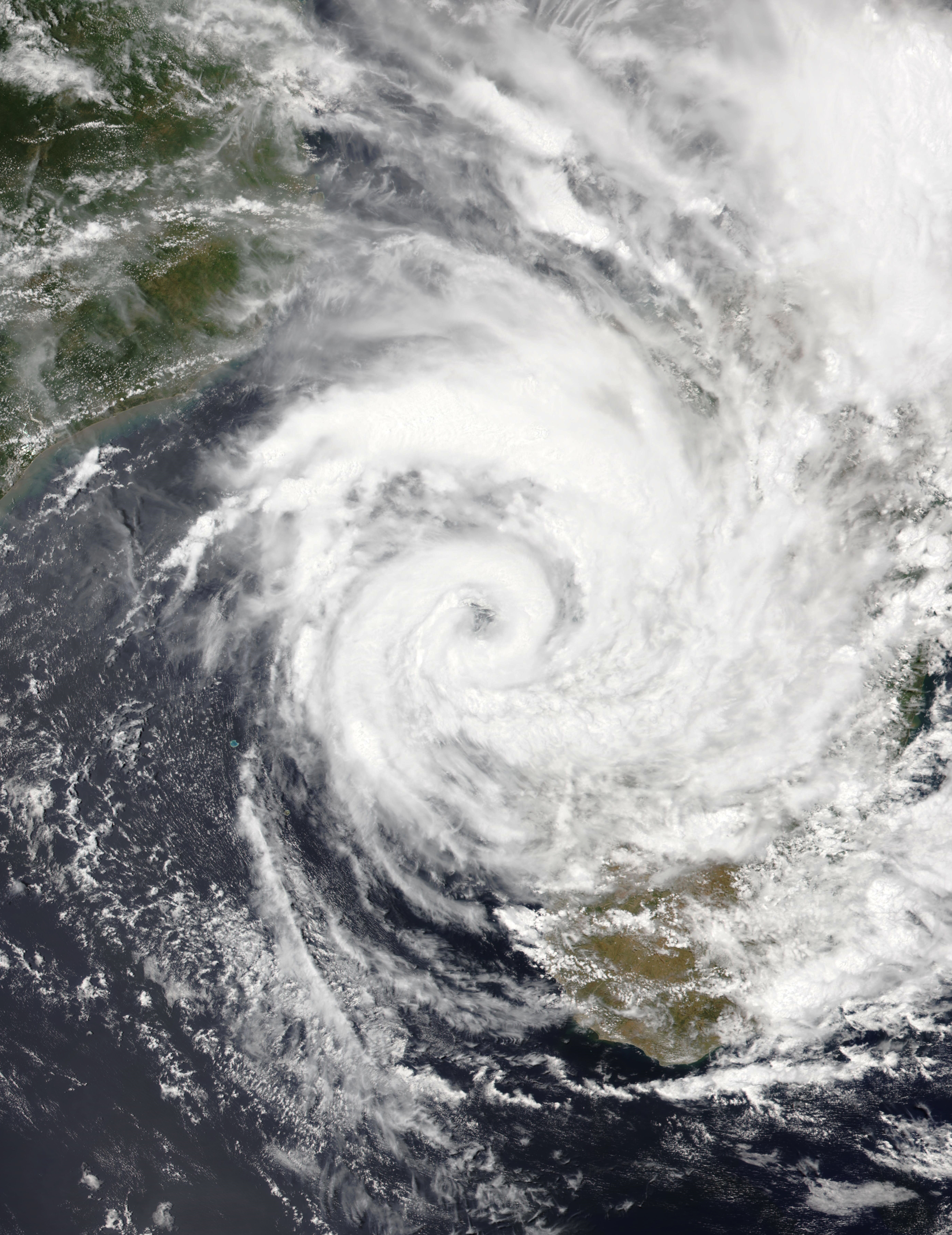
Cyclone Cheneso

January was active, featuring twelve systems with five of them being named. From 2022, Cyclone Ellie from the Australian region persisted into 2023. The first storm of the year started off with a short lived disturbance classified as 03F, which formed in the South Pacific basin. Shortly after 03F, a tropical low classified as 07U formed in the Australian basin and later entered the South Pacific basin. There, 07U strengthened into a tropical cyclone and was named Hale by the FMS; becoming the first named storm of the year. The northern part of New Zealand suffered minor flooding after Hale's remnants made landfall over the country on January 10, and one indirect fatality was reported. Four days later, Irene formed, becoming the second named storm in the basin. Irene passed near New Caledonia and Vanuatu however, no serious damage was reported. Moreover, in the Australian and South Pacific basins, four tropical lows classified as 06F, 10U, 11U, and 12U formed. The remnants of 06F contributed to major flooding in New Zealand which caused 4 fatalities. In the South-West Indian Ocean basin, Cyclone Cheneso formed south of Diego Garcia and made landfall over northern Madagascar. After landfall, Cheneso's remnants reorganized in the Mozambique Channel and intensified into a Category 2 cyclone, becoming the strongest storm of the month. Cheneso devastated much of the country and destroyed many infrastructures due to its slow movement off the coast while reorganizing. As of January 31, 33 fatalities were reported from the cyclone. In the Atlantic, a non-tropical low developed over the Gulf Stream in mid-January. During its routine post-operational review, the NHC concluded that from January 16 to 17, the system had been a subtropical storm. Retroactively designated as the first storm of the season, though not given a name, the storm made landfall on the far northeastern coast of Nova Scotia just before it became a post-tropical low, which later dissipated over far eastern Quebec. The Northern Indian Ocean basin also had an early start with a depression classified as BOB 01 forming on January 30. In the South Atlantic, a subtropical depression formed off the coast of Brazil. The depression however, moved away from the coast and weakened. 11U moved into the Southwest Indian Ocean basin on February 9, where it was assigned the name Dingani. It later intensified to Tropical Cyclone on the MFR's scale and Category 1 on the SSHWS. It eventually intensified to Tropical Cyclone status before turning southward and eventually transitioning into a post-tropical depression. The Mediterranean Sea featured Cyclone Hannelore, a short-lived system in the Adriatic Sea.

Tropical cyclones formed in January 2023
Storm name	Dates active	Max wind km/h (mph)	Pressure (hPa)	Areas affected	Damage (USD)	Deaths	Refs
03F	January 5–7	Unknown	1000	New Caledonia	None	None	
Hale	January 6–8	65 (40)	994	New Caledonia, New Zealand	Unknown	0 (1)	
#01-2023	January 7–10	55 (35)	1010	Rio de Janeiro	None	None	
Irene	January 14–20	100 (65)	980	New Caledonia, Vanuatu	Unknown	None	
Cheneso	January 16–29	140 (85)	965	Madagascar	$20 million	33	
Unnamed	January 16–17	110 (70)	976	Nova Scotia	None	None	
06F	January 18–22	55 (35)	996	New Caledonia, New Zealand	$1.43 billion	4	
10U	January 22–26	Unknown	1001	Northern Territory	None	None	
Dingani	January 27 – February 15	140 (85)	971	None	None	None	
BOB 01	January 30 – February 2	45 (30)	1004	Sri Lanka	None	None	
12U	January 31 – February 4	Unknown	1002	None	None	None	

=== February ===
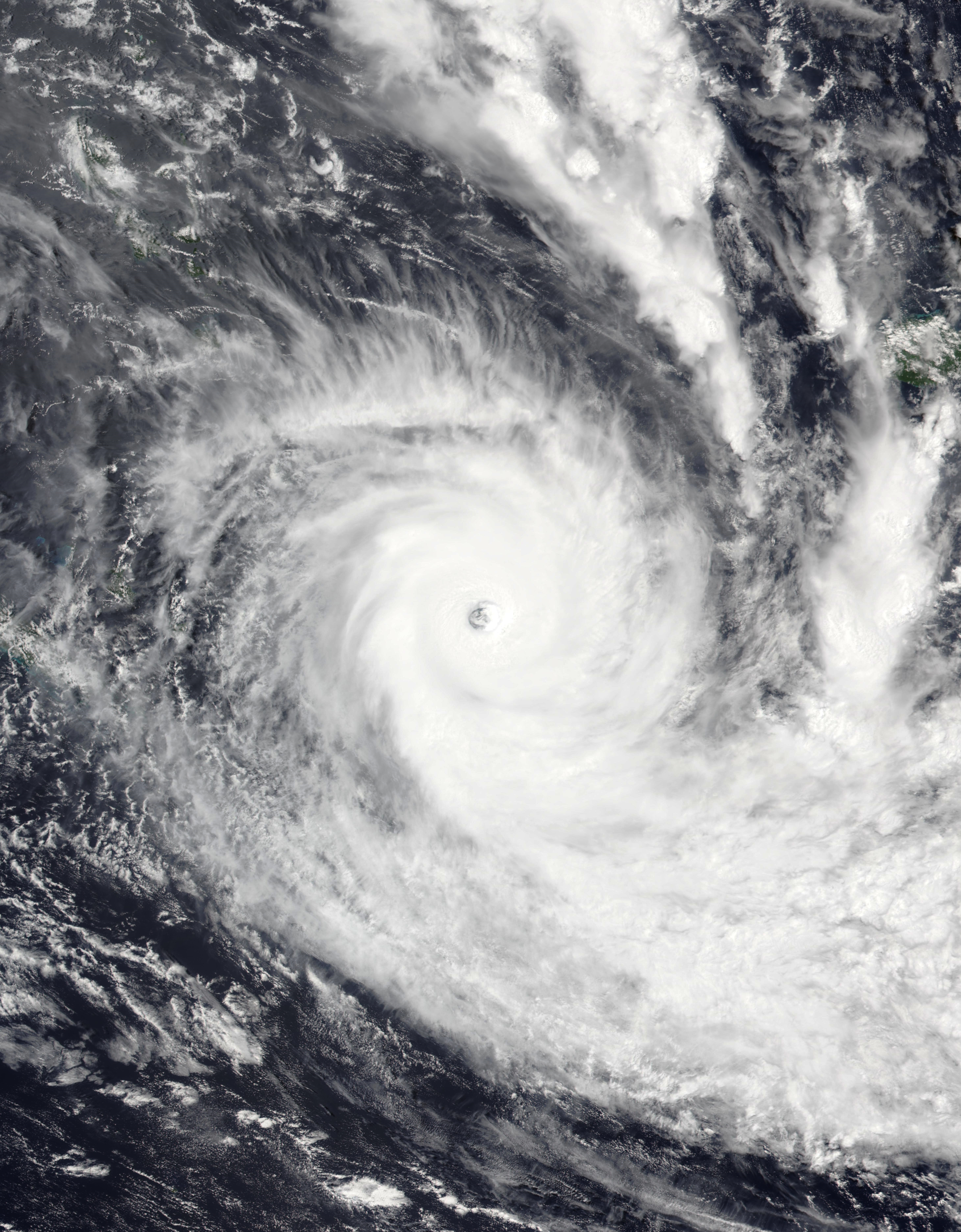
Cyclone Kevin

February was active, featuring nine systems with five of them being named. The month started off with Freddy, which formed in the Australian Region on February 4. Freddy became a Category 4-equivalent cyclone before crossing into the South-West Indian Ocean basin. There, the MFR immediately classified Freddy as an intense tropical cyclone. The cyclone further intensified into a Category 5-equivalent tropical cyclone, becoming the first one of the year. Freddy continued travelling across the Indian Ocean before making landfall over Madagascar and Mozambique, killing at least 100 people. Unexpectedly, Freddy emerged back over the Mozambique Channel and restrengthed back into a cyclone. The cyclone then made its second landfall over Mozambique and dissipated on March 14; ending its erratic five-week lifespan. Freddy left severe destruction across its path and killed at least 1,400 people. Freddy also became the longest-lived tropical cyclone on record and was also the first cyclone since Leon–Eline and Hudah in 2000 to travel across the entire Southern Indian Ocean. On February 6, Cyclone Gabrielle formed in the Australian Region. As Gabrielle headed towards New Zealand, the cyclone reached its peak intensity as a category 3 cyclone. Gabrielle caused extensive damage across New Zealand and other nearby countries. Gabrielle became the costliest tropical cyclone on record in the Southern Hemisphere. Additionally, the cyclone was the deadliest in New Zealand since 1968. Cyclone Enala formed on February 19 in the Southern Indian Ocean and reached its peak as a category 1-equivalent cyclone. However, Enala had no effect on land. Judy and Kevin both formed in the South Pacific basin and intensified into major cyclones. The two cyclones later impacted Vanuatu. Four other weak tropical lows also formed in the Australian Region. Most were short lived and were no threat to land.

Tropical cyclones formed in February 2023
Storm name	Dates active	Max wind km/h (mph)	Pressure (hPa)	Areas affected	Damage (USD)	Deaths	Refs
Freddy	February 4 – March 14	230 (145)	927	Mascarene Islands, Madagascar, Mozambique, Zimbabwe, Malawi	$1.53 billion	1,434	
Gabrielle	February 6–11	150 (90)	958	Norfolk Island, New Zealand	$9.2 billion	11 (1)	
15U	February 11–17	45 (30)	997	None	None	None	
TL	February 17–18	Unknown	1004	None	None	None	
Enala	February 21–28	120 (75)	980	None	None	None	
Judy	February 23 – March 4	185 (115)	940	Vanuatu	Unknown	None	
16U	February 23 – March 10	Unknown	995	Western Australia, Northern Territory	None	None	
17U	February 24–27	Unknown	999	Northern Territory	None	None	
Kevin	February 27 – March 5	230 (145)	913	Solomon Islands, Vanuatu	$433 million	None	

=== March ===
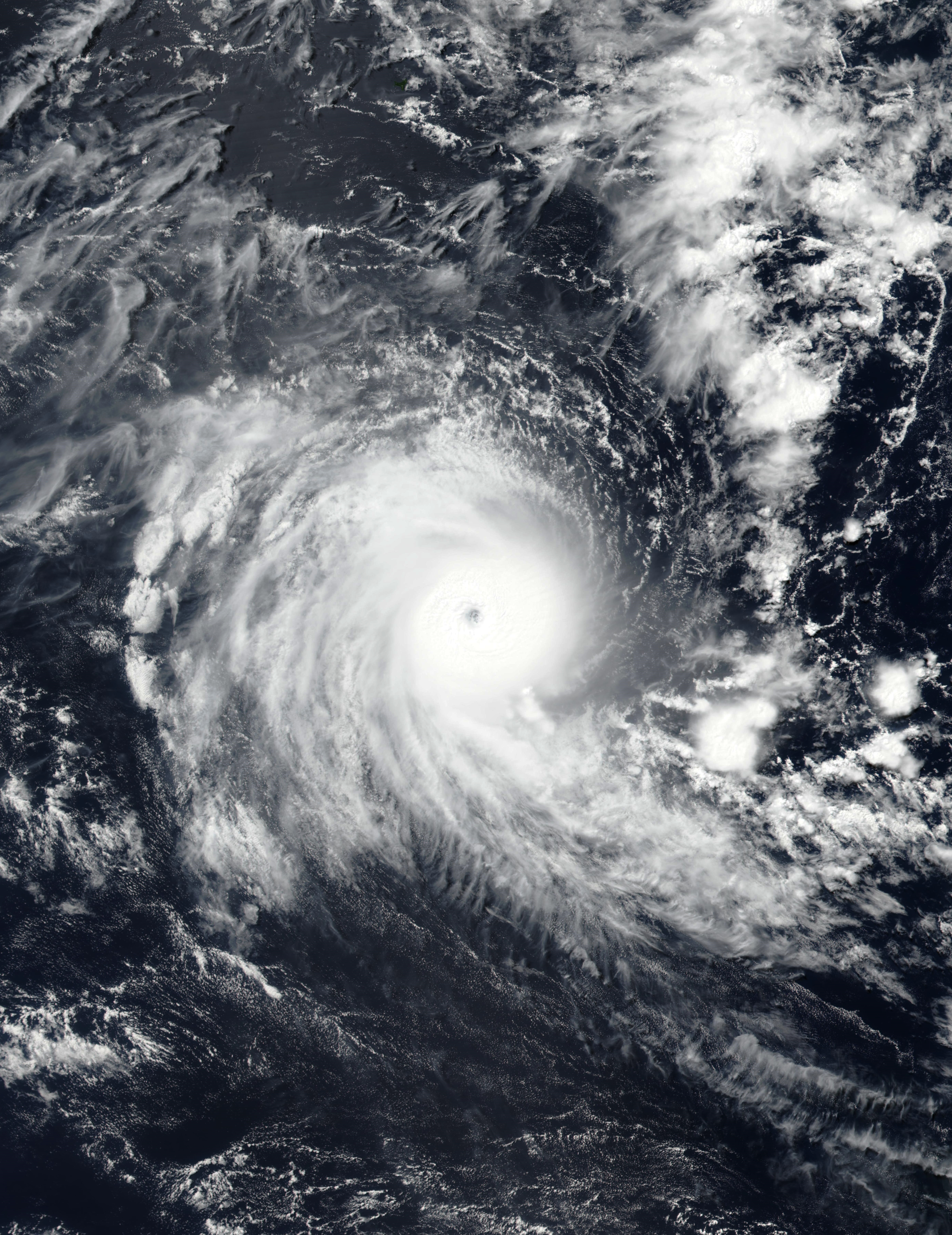
Cyclone Herman

March was inactive, especially in terms of named storms, featuring nine systems with only two of them being named. The month also includes an unofficial cyclone named Yaku which formed off the coast of Peru and Ecuador. In the Northern Pacific basin, a tropical depression formed on March 4 east of Singapore near the equator, becoming the first storm of the year to form in the basin. The depression dissipated the next day. However, the storm killed four people after flooding parts of Malaysia. In the South Pacific basin, three tropical lows classified as 10F, 11F, and 12F formed and dissipated without causing serious damage. In the Australian basin, three systems formed with Herman being the strongest storm of the month. Herman formed on March 29 and headed towards the Australian coast and later reached its peak intensity as a Category 5 severe tropical cyclone on the Australian scale. The cyclone however turned around and weakened due to dry air. Herman was last noted on April 5 by the JTWC. In the Southern Indian Ocean basin, a short lived depression classified as 09 formed on March 25 and dissipated two days later without affecting any landmass. Yaku, being an unofficial storm of the South Pacific basin unusually formed in the Southeastern Pacific near South America. The cyclone killed at least eight people and caused serious damage across Peru and Ecuador.

Tropical cyclones formed in March 2023
Storm name	Dates active	Max wind km/h (mph)	Pressure (hPa)	Areas affected	Damage (USD)	Deaths	Refs
TD	March 4–7	55 (35)	1008	Brunei, Indonesia, Malaysia, Singapore	Unknown	4	
Yaku	March 7–20	Unknown	1009	Peru, Ecuador	$690 million	≥8	
10F	March 8–13	Unknown	1006	Niue	None	None	
11F	March 11–23	Unknown	1006	Tonga, Niue	None	None	
12F	March 11–21	Unknown	1005	New Caledonia	None	None	
20U	March 25–31	Unknown	1005	None	None	None	
09	March 25–28	75 (45)	997	None	None	None	
Herman	March 28 – April 3	215 (130)	930	Cocos Islands	None	None	
22U	March 30 – April 2	Unknown	Unknown	None	None	None	

=== April ===
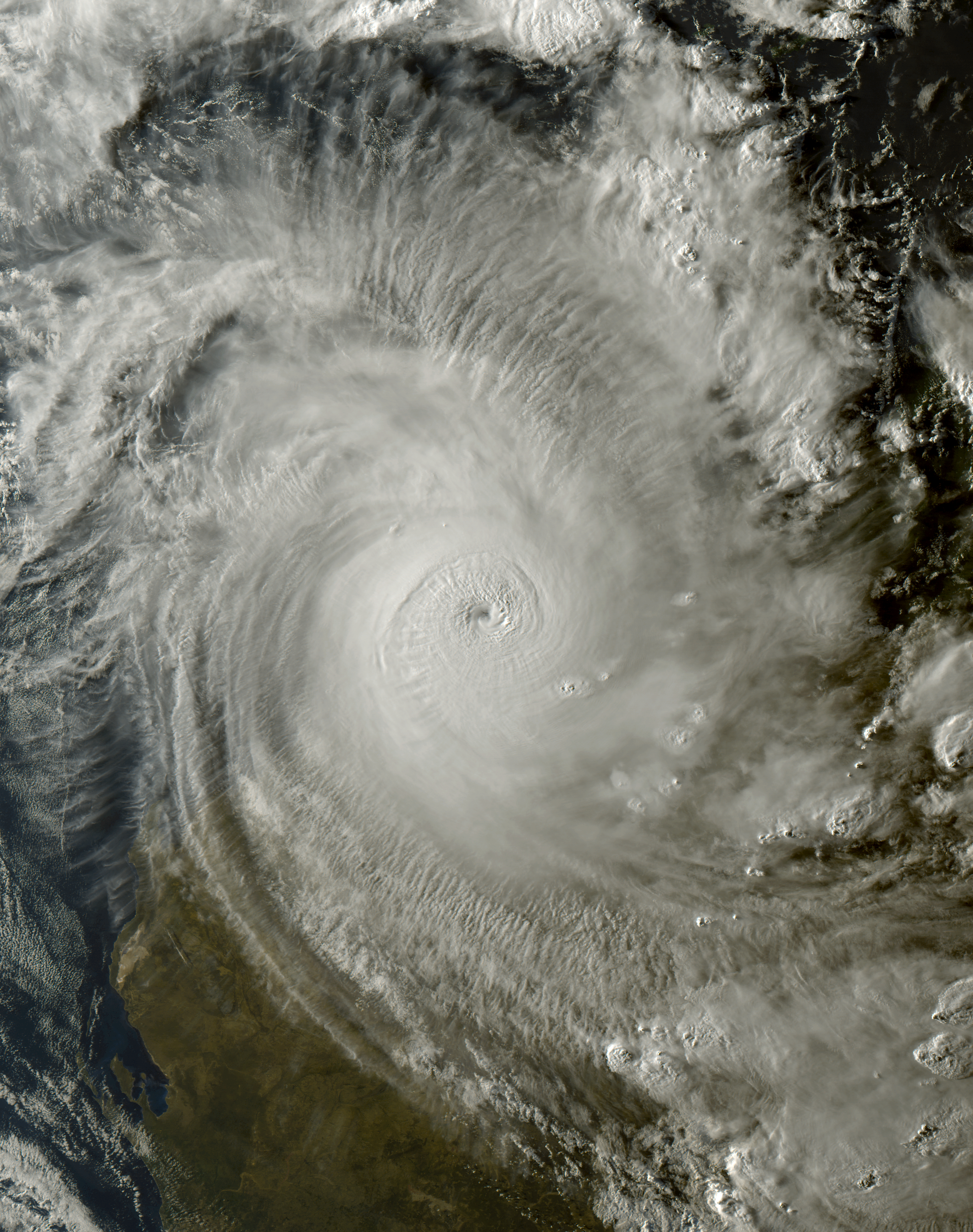
Cyclone Ilsa

April was a very inactive month, featuring only five systems with two (Note: Amang, which was named by the PAGASA does not count as a named storm. Only storms named by the JMA are counted in the basin.) of them being named. The month started off with a disturbance forming in the Australian Region on April 5. The disturbance, which was classified as 23U was later named Ilsa by the BoM on April 10. Ilsa continued on and reached its peak intensity as a Category 5 cyclone on both the Australian scale and the SSHWS as it neared the Australian coast, becoming the strongest storm of the month. The cyclone made landfall east of Port Hedland and weakened before it was last noted on April 16. In the Western Pacific basin, the JMA noted a low pressure area forming in the Philippine Sea on April 7. The low was later classified as a tropical depression after its structure slightly improved. As it entered the PAR, the depression was named Amang by the PAGASA. Amang made three landfalls in Southern Luzon before weakening into a remnant low on April 3 due to dry air and wind shear. A week later, a tropical depression formed near Pohnpei. The depression later intensified into a tropical storm, where it was named Sanvu by the JMA, becoming the first named storm in the basin. Sanvu however, failed to intensify further due to its poor structure and dissipated on April 25. In the South Pacific basin, a disturbance classified as 13F formed and entered the basin from the Australian basin. The disturbance however was poorly organized and never intensified further. On April 30, a weak tropical low, to the south of Christmas Island, was noted by the BoM.

Tropical cyclones formed in April 2023
Storm name	Dates active	Max wind km/h (mph)	Pressure (hPa)	Areas affected	Damage (USD)	Deaths	Refs
Ilsa	April 5–16	230 (145)	930	Maluku, Lesser Sunda Islands, Northern Territory, Western Australia	>$10.2 million	8	
Amang	April 10–13	55 (35)	1004	Palau, Philippines	$223,000	None	
13F	April 14–18	Unknown	999	None	None	None	
Sanvu	April 19–22	85 (50)	996	Federated States of Micronesia	None	None	
TL	April 30 – May 2	Unknown	Unknown	Christmas Island	None	None	

=== May ===
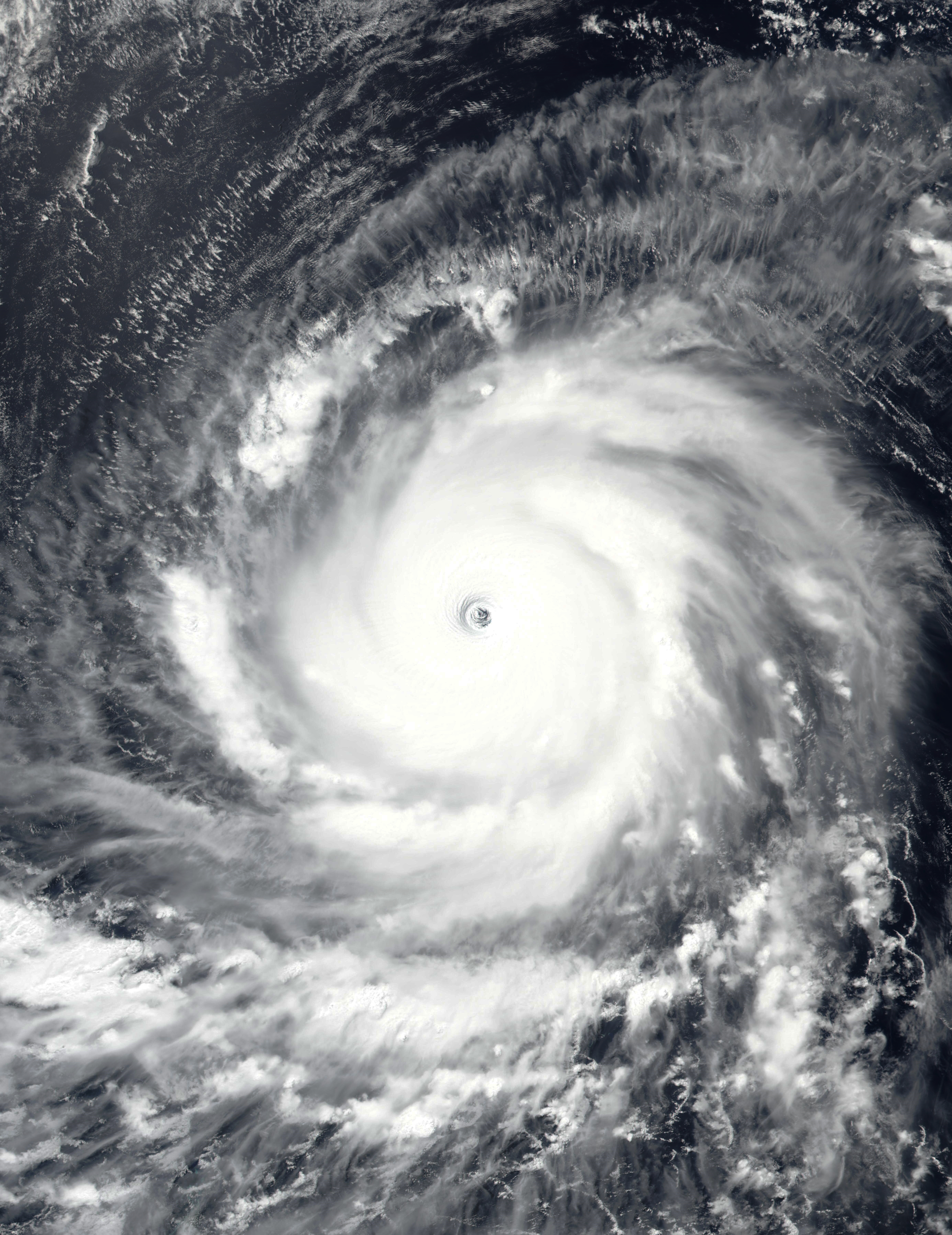
Typhoon Mawar

May was a slightly inactive month in terms of named storms, featuring four systems with three of them being named. However, the number of intense tropical cyclones and the ACE were both far above normal. The month started off with a tropical depression, which formed in the Sulu Sea. The system crossed Palawan and entered the South China Sea on May 5 before dissipating two days later. Moreover, in the West Pacific basin, a tropical depression formed near the Chuuk Islands on May 19. On the next day, the JMA named the depression Mawar. Mawar continued intensifying before intensifying into a Category 1-equivalent typhoon, becoming the first typhoon to form in the basin. It later intensified into a Category 5-equivalent typhoon after striking Guam, becoming the strongest storm of the month and currently worldwide. In the Northern Indian Ocean basin, the IMD began monitoring a tropical depression which formed in the Bay of Bengal on May 9. The system was later named Mocha by the IMD after intensifying into a tropical storm. Mocha continued strengthening further; eventually becoming a Category 5-equivalent tropical cyclone on the SSHWS scale. On May 14, the cyclone made landfall on Myanmar and rapidly weakened before it was last noted over China on the next day. Mocha caused heavy damage across Myanmar and Bangladesh and killed at least 400 people. In the South-West Indian Ocean basin, a disturbance formed close to the equator on May 12, east of Indonesia and to the south of strengthening Cyclone Mocha. The MFR later named the system Fabien after reaching tropical storm status. Fabien reached its peak intensity as a Category 3-equivalent cyclone on May 15, becoming the latest tropical cyclone of that intensity, surpassing Cyclone Billy-Lila of 1986 by 6 days. Fabien started to weaken on the next day due to wind shear and dry air. The cyclone degenerated into a remnant low and was last noted on May 21.

Tropical cyclones formed in May 2023
Storm name	Dates active	Max wind km/h (mph)	Pressure (hPa)	Areas affected	Damage (USD)	Deaths	Refs
TD	May 5–7	Unknown	1004	Philippines	None	None	
Mocha	May 9–15	215 (130)	938	Andaman and Nicobar Islands, Myanmar, Bangladesh, India, Yunnan	$2.24 billion	463	
Fabien	May 12–21	175 (110)	958	Diego Garcia	None	16	
Mawar (Betty)	May 19 – June 3	215 (130)	900	Federated States of Micronesia, Guam, Northern Mariana Islands, Philippines, Taiwan, Japan, Russian Far East, Alaska	$4.3 billion	6	

=== June ===
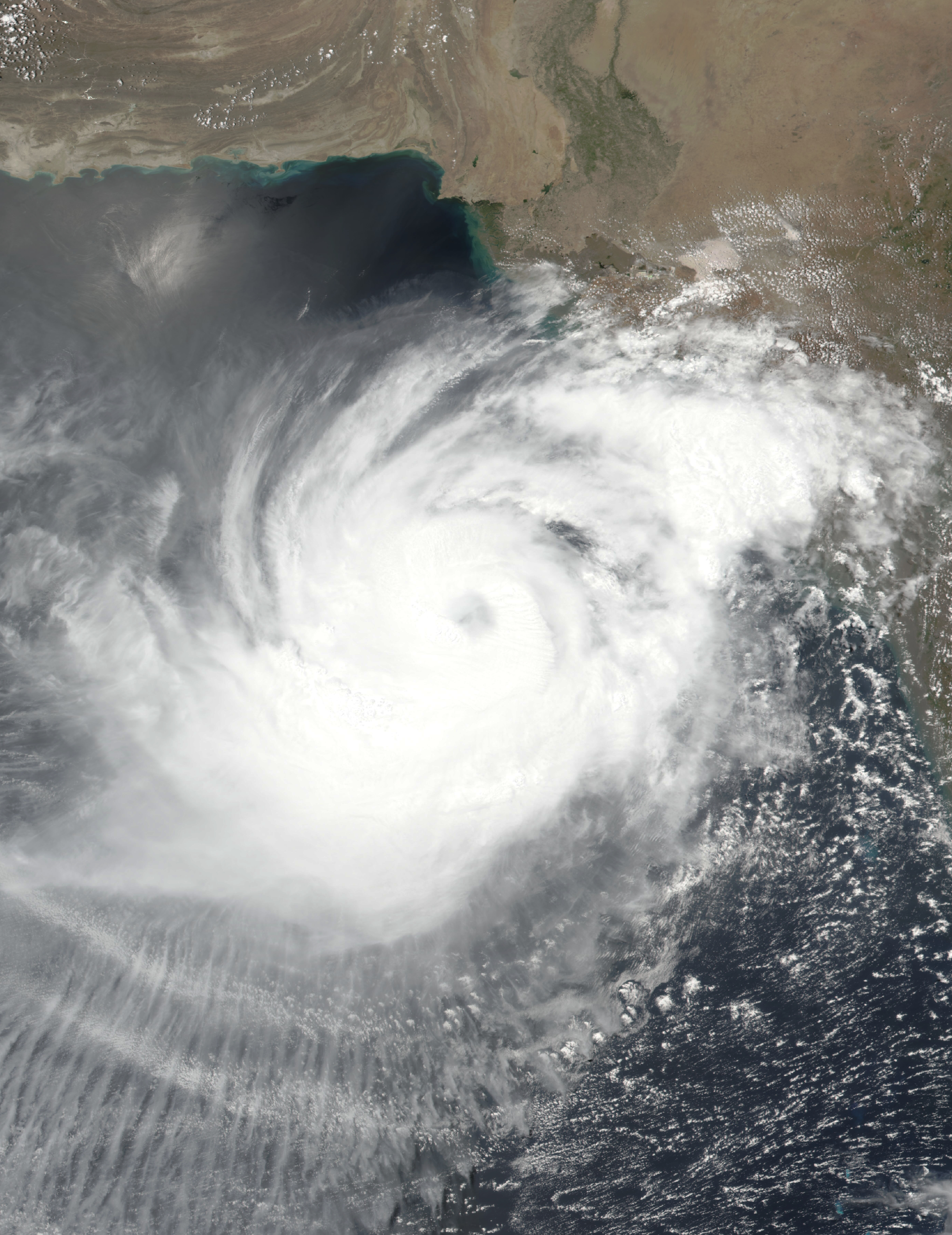
Cyclone Biparjoy

June was active, featuring nine systems with seven of them being named. An area of interest formed in the Gulf of Mexico on May 31. The disturbance quickly became better organized and at 21:00 UTC on June 1, the system was designated as Tropical Depression Two. A day later, the system strengthened into a tropical storm, and named Arlene. On June 6, two tropical depressions formed in the Arabian Sea and in the Philippine Sea. The depression in the Philippine Sea later strengthened into Tropical Storm Guchol at 20:00 UTC. And in the Arabian Sea, the depression strengthened into a tropical storm, which received the name Biparjoy. It rapidly intensified to become a category 3-equivalent tropical cyclone, becoming the strongest storm of the month. Later, on June 19, a tropical depression formed in the Atlantic, later receiving the name Bret when it attained tropical storm strength. Another tropical depression developed just a few days later, on June 22, receiving the name Cindy early the next day after being upgraded to a tropical storm. On June 25, in the Eastern Pacific, a depression formed near the coast of Mexico, which upon strengthening into a tropical storm three days later, was named Adrian. This system rapidly strengthen into a category 2 hurricane. Another area of low pressure formed near the southwest coast of Costa Rica on June 25. A few days later, the system organized as a tropical storm, assigned the name as Beatriz.

Tropical cyclones formed in June 2023
Storm name	Dates active	Max wind km/h (mph)	Pressure (hPa)	Areas affected	Damage (USD)	Deaths	Refs
Arlene	June 1–3	65 (40)	998	Florida	$50,000	None	
Guchol (Chedeng)	June 5–12	150 (90)	960	None	None	None	
Biparjoy	June 6–19	165 (105)	958	Western India, Pakistan	$148 million	17	
TD	June 7–11	Unknown	1000	South China, Vietnam	None	None	
03B	June 9–10	75 (45)	991	Bangladesh, Myanmar	None	None	
Bret	June 19–24	110 (70)	996	Barbados, Windward Islands, Leeward Antilles, Venezuela, Northeastern Colombia	$445,000	None	
Cindy	June 22–26	95 (60)	1004	None	None	None	
Adrian	June 27 – July 2	175 (110)	970	None	None	None	
Beatriz	June 29 – July 1	140 (85)	991	Southwestern Mexico	Minimal	(1)	

=== July ===
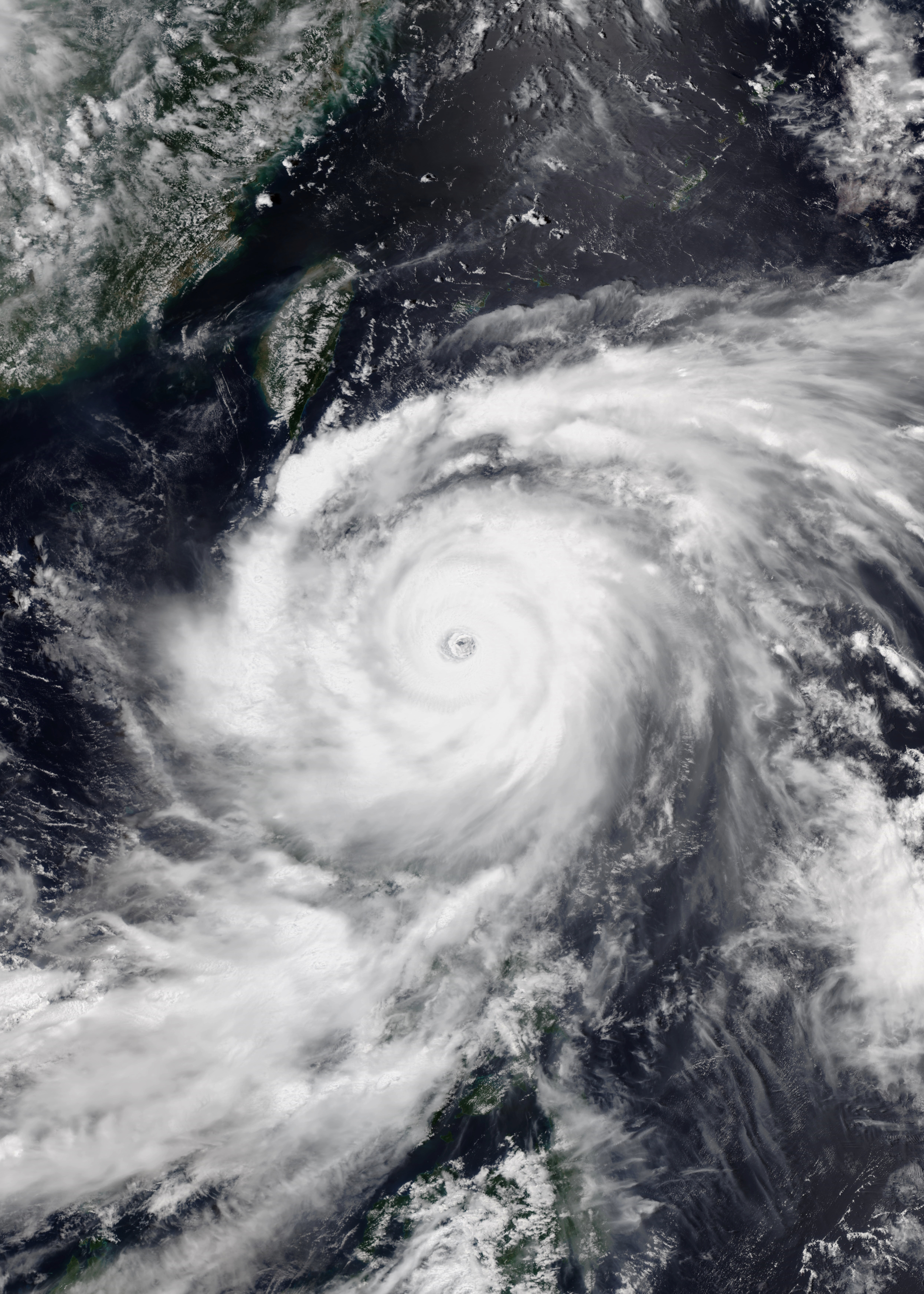
Typhoon Doksuri

July was average, featuring eight systems forming with six of them being named. The month started off with a disturbance, which formed off the coast of Southern Mexico on July 11. The disturbance became well organized several days later and it was later designated as Tropical Depression Three-E. The next day, it strengthened and was named Calvin. It then began to rapidly intensify and became the first major hurricane of the 2023 Pacific hurricane season at 15:00 UTC on July 14. In the Western Pacific, after several weeks of inactivity, on July 12, a tropical depression formed off the coast of Aurora, Philippines. It made landfall in Dinapigue, Isabela on the next day. Prior to exiting the PAR, the system gained the name Talim as it was upgraded into a tropical storm. In the Atlantic Ocean, a trough of low-pressure formed east-northeast of Bermuda. A well-defined center of circulation developed along with persistent deep convection early on July 14, prompting the NHC to classify it as Subtropical Storm Don early that morning. After weakening to a depression, Don became fully tropical and strengthened to become the first hurricane of the season. Another low pressure formed east of Mindanao on July 19. 2 days later, JMA named the system as Doksuri. Doksuri further intensified and peaked as a Category 4-equivalent super typhoon late on July 24, becoming the strongest storm of the month. Shortly after Typhoon Doksuri reached its peak, a new depression formed to its east. On July 27, it received the name Khanun from the JMA, and on July 29, it received the name Falcon by the PAGASA. By the end of July, Typhoon Khanun had become a category 4 equivalent typhoon. On July 31, Tropical Depression Five-E formed in the Eastern Pacific. It strengthened the next day, and was given the name Dora. Soon thereafter, it rapidly intensified, becoming a Category 4 hurricane and tracked westward, where it entered the Central Pacific and passed well south of Hawaii on August 8, with trade winds that may have caused the Maui Fires. Later, on August 11, Hurricane Dora, now a category 2, crossed the International Date Line, entering the Northwestern Pacific basin as a typhoon. Dora finally dissipated on August 21.

Tropical cyclones formed in July 2023
Storm name	Dates active	Max wind km/h (mph)	Pressure (hPa)	Areas affected	Damage (USD)	Deaths	Refs
Calvin	July 11–19	205 (125)	953	Hawaii	None	None	
Talim (Dodong)	July 13–18	110 (70)	970	Philippines, South China, Vietnam	$364 million	3	
Don	July 14–24	120 (75)	986	None	None	None	
Doksuri (Egay)	July 20–30	185 (115)	925	Philippines, South China, Taiwan, East China, North China	$28.6 billion	137	
Four-E	July 21–22	55 (35)	1006	None	None	None	
Khanun (Falcon)	July 26 – August 12	175 (110)	930	Philippines, Taiwan, Japan, Korean Peninsula, China, Russian Far East	$98.1 million	13	
BOB 03	July 31 – August 3	55 (35)	988	Myanmar, Bangladesh, West Bengal, Jharkhand, Odisha, Bihar, Chhattisgarh	None	None	
Dora	July 31 – August 21	240 (150)	939	Hawaii, Johnston Atoll	None	None	

=== August ===
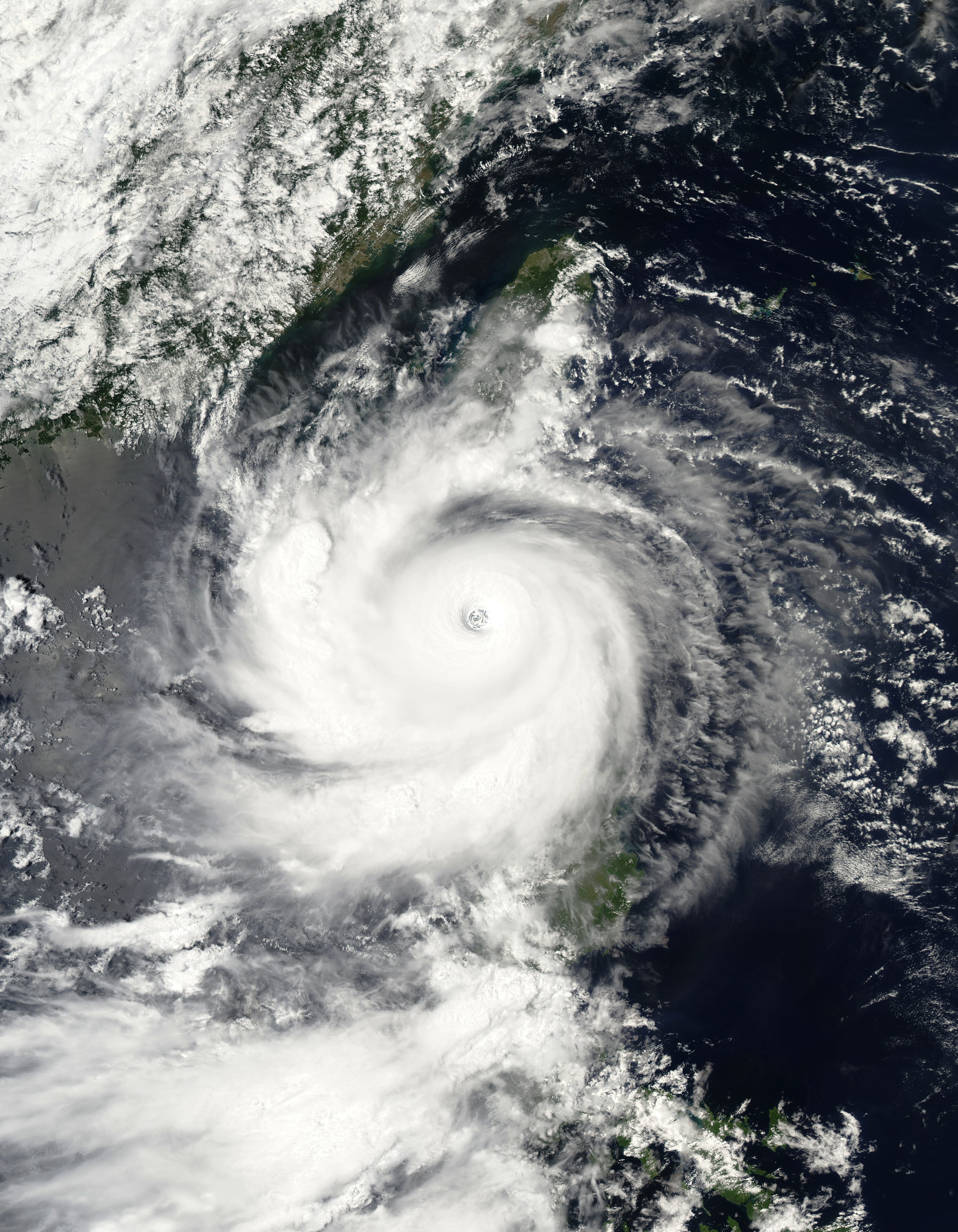
Typhoon Saola

August was above average, featuring nineteen systems forming with sixteen of them being named. The month started off with Typhoon Khanun beginning to weaken. It stalled around the Ryukyu Islands, and began to head towards Japan. On August 8, it made landfall on Japan and Korea. On August 11, Khanun dissipated over North Korea. Additionally, Deep Depression BOB 03 made landfall on the border of India and Bangladesh. On August 4, a tropical depression formed west of Hainan. Then, on August 5, Tropical Depression Six-E formed in the eastern Pacific. It later intensified into Tropical Storm Eugene. However, Eugene began to quickly weaken after nearly reaching hurricane status. Another tropical depression had formed near Minamitorishima in Japan. On August 8, it received the name Lan. On August 13, Seven-E formed in the Eastern Pacific. The same day, it quickly strengthened into a tropical storm and was named Fernanda. Fernanda strengthened into a Category 1 hurricane the following day. Soon after, Fernanda became a Category 4 hurricane. On August 15, Tropical Depression Eight-E formed and intensified into Tropical Storm Greg. On August 16, both Fernanda and Greg dissipated. The next day, Hilary formed and moved northwest towards California. On August 20, Hilary made landfall on the Baja California Peninsula and moved north into California. The day before, Tropical Depression Six formed in the open Atlantic, it would eventually become Tropical Storm Gert on the 21st, dying off quickly but reforming on August 31. Also on the 20th, tropical storms Emily and Franklin formed, both in the Atlantic with Emily in the main development region, and Franklin south of Puerto Rico. As Franklin moved northwest, it made landfall on Hispaniola. When it re-emerged over the Atlantic Ocean, it rapidly intensified into a Category 4 Hurricane. On August 21, Tropical Depression Nine formed in the Gulf Of Mexico. The system strengthened into Tropical Storm Harold and quickly made landfall in Texas. The same day, Severe Tropical Storm Damrey formed in the Western Pacific along with Typhoon Saola forming the next day. Saola peaked as a Category 5-equivalent super typhoon as it neared eastern Luzon, becoming the strongest storm of the month. On August 26, Hurricane Idalia formed in the Gulf Of Mexico and rapidly intensified into a Category 4, just like Franklin before making landfall in the Big Bend Region of Florida. On August 30, Idalia re-emerged over the Atlantic Ocean east of the Carolinas as a tropical storm, and soon downgraded to a Post-Tropical Cyclone. The day after Idalia formed, 2 systems formed in the Pacific Ocean. In the west, Typhoon Haikui formed in the West Pacific Main Development Region. In the east, Tropical Storm Irwin formed and moved west, before dying out due to unfavorable conditions for Tropical cyclogenesis on August 29. On August 29, Tropical Storm Kirogi formed in a similar place as Haikui, yet moved in a different direction. Along with Kirogi, Tropical Storms Jose and Katia formed in the Atlantic Ocean. Unfavorable conditions were battling this storm as it moved north, and then it was absorbed by Hurricane Franklin.

Tropical cyclones formed in August 2023
Storm name	Dates active	Max wind km/h (mph)	Pressure (hPa)	Areas affected	Damage (USD)	Deaths	Refs
TD	August 3–4	Unknown	1002	South China, Vietnam	None	None	
Eugene	August 5–7	110 (70)	992	Baja California Peninsula, Southwestern Mexico	None	None	
Lan	August 7–17	165 (105)	940	Bonin Islands, Japan	$500 million	1	
Fernanda	August 12–17	215 (130)	949	None	None	None	
Greg	August 14–18	85 (50)	1000	None	None	None	
Hilary	August 16–21	220 (140)	940	Western México, Revillagigedo Islands, Baja California peninsula, Southwestern United States	$948 million	2	
Gert	August 19 – September 4	95 (60)	998	None	None	None	
TD	August 19–21	Unknown	1004	None	None	None	
Emily	August 20–21	85 (50)	998	None	None	None	
Franklin	August 20 – September 1	240 (150)	926	Lesser Antilles, Eastern Greater Antilles, Northern Venezuela, Northern Colombia, Puerto Rico, Bermuda	$90 million	2	
Damrey	August 21–29	95 (60)	985	None	None	None	
Harold	August 21–23	95 (60)	995	Texas, Northern Mexico	$505,000	1	
Saola (Goring)	August 22 – September 3	195 (120)	920	Philippines, Hong Kong, Taiwan, South China, Macau, Vietnam	$673 million	3	
Idalia	August 26–31	215 (130)	942	Yucatan Peninsula, Western Cuba, Florida, Georgia, Carolinas	$3.6 billion	12	
Haikui (Hanna)	August 27 – September 6	155 (100)	945	Northern Mariana Islands, Taiwan, Philippines, China	$2.55 billion	16	
Irwin	August 27–29	65 (40)	997	None	None	None	
Kirogi	August 29 – September 4	85 (50)	994	None	None	None	
Jose	August 29 – September 2	100 (65)	996	None	None	None	
Katia	August 31 – September 4	95 (60)	998	None	None	None	

=== September ===
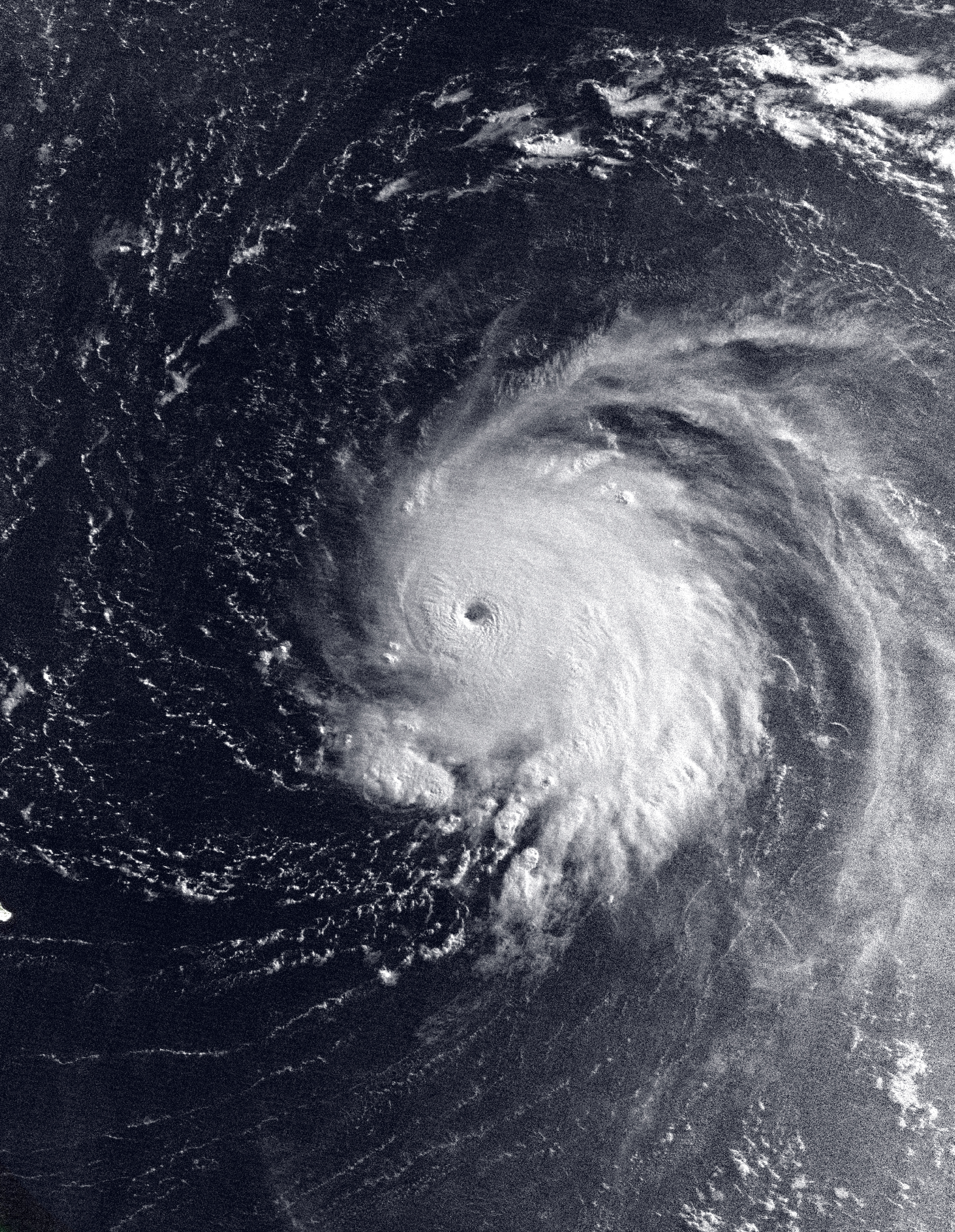
Hurricane Lee

September was very active, featuring nineteen systems with twelve of them being named. The month also includes an unofficial cyclone named Daniel which formed in the Mediterranean Sea. In the Atlantic, Hurricanes Lee, Margot, Nigel, as well as Tropical Storms, Ophelia, Philippe, and Rina formed. Ophelia made landfall over North Carolina while Philippe affected several countries in the Caribbean. Lee on the other hand, intensified into a Category 5 hurricane over the open Atlantic before making landfall over Nova Scotia, becoming the strongest storm of the month. In the Eastern Pacific, Hurricane Jova, Tropical Storm Kenneth, as well as two short-lived depressions formed. Jova reached its peak intensity as a Category 5 and became one of the fastest intensifying tropical cyclones on record in the basin. Kenneth on the other hand, had no effect on land. In the Western Pacific, Typhoon Koinu, Tropical Storm Yun-yeung and five weak depressions formed. Koinu reached its peak intensity as a Category 4 typhoon and passed south of Taiwan before impacting the Pearl River Delta while Yun-yeung brought heavy rainfall across Japan, disrupting several train services. In the North Indian basin, a low pressure area, which was classified as ARB 02, was noted off the Konkan coast on September 30. The depression however dissipated the next day. Daniel, which formed in the Mediterranean Sea, caused severe destruction across Greece, Turkey, Bulgaria and particularly Libya. The storm killed at least 10,028 people in Libya alone, becoming the deadliest Mediterranean tropical-like cyclone in recorded history, and the deadliest cyclone since Typhoon Haiyan in 2013.

Tropical cyclones formed in September 2023
Storm name	Dates active	Max wind km/h (mph)	Pressure (hPa)	Areas affected	Damage (USD)	Deaths	Refs
TD	September 3–4	Unknown	1002	None	None	None	
TD	September 4–6	Unknown	1010	None	None	None	
Daniel	September 4–12	85 (50)	997	Libya, Italy, Greece, Egypt	$21.1 billion	5,951	
Yun-yeung (Ineng)	September 4–9	75 (45)	998	Japan	None	None	
Jova	September 4–10	260 (160)	926	Western Mexico, Southwestern United States	$251,000	None	
Lee	September 5–16	270 (165)	926	Bermuda, New England, Canadian Maritimes	$50 million	3	
Margot	September 7–17	150 (90)	969	Cape Verde	None	None	
TD	September 10–14	Unknown	1004	None	None	None	
TD	September 12	Unknown	1004	None	None	None	
Nigel	September 15–22	155 (100)	971	None	None	None	
Twelve-E	September 15–17	55 (35)	1006	None	None	None	
Kenneth	September 19–22	85 (50)	1000	None	None	None	
Ophelia	September 22–24	110 (70)	981	Southeastern United States	$450 million	None	
Philippe	September 23 – October 6	95 (60)	998	Leeward Islands	$3.4 million	None	
Fourteen-E	September 23–24	55 (35)	1007	None	None	None	
13W	September 24–27	Unknown	1000	Vietnam	None	None	
Rina	September 28 – October 2	85 (50)	999	None	None	None	
Koinu (Jenny)	September 28 – October 9	165 (105)	940	Philippines, Taiwan, Northern Mariana Islands	$28.9 million	None	
ARB 02	September 30 – October 1	45 (30)	1002	Goa, Maharashtra, Karnataka	None	None	

=== October ===
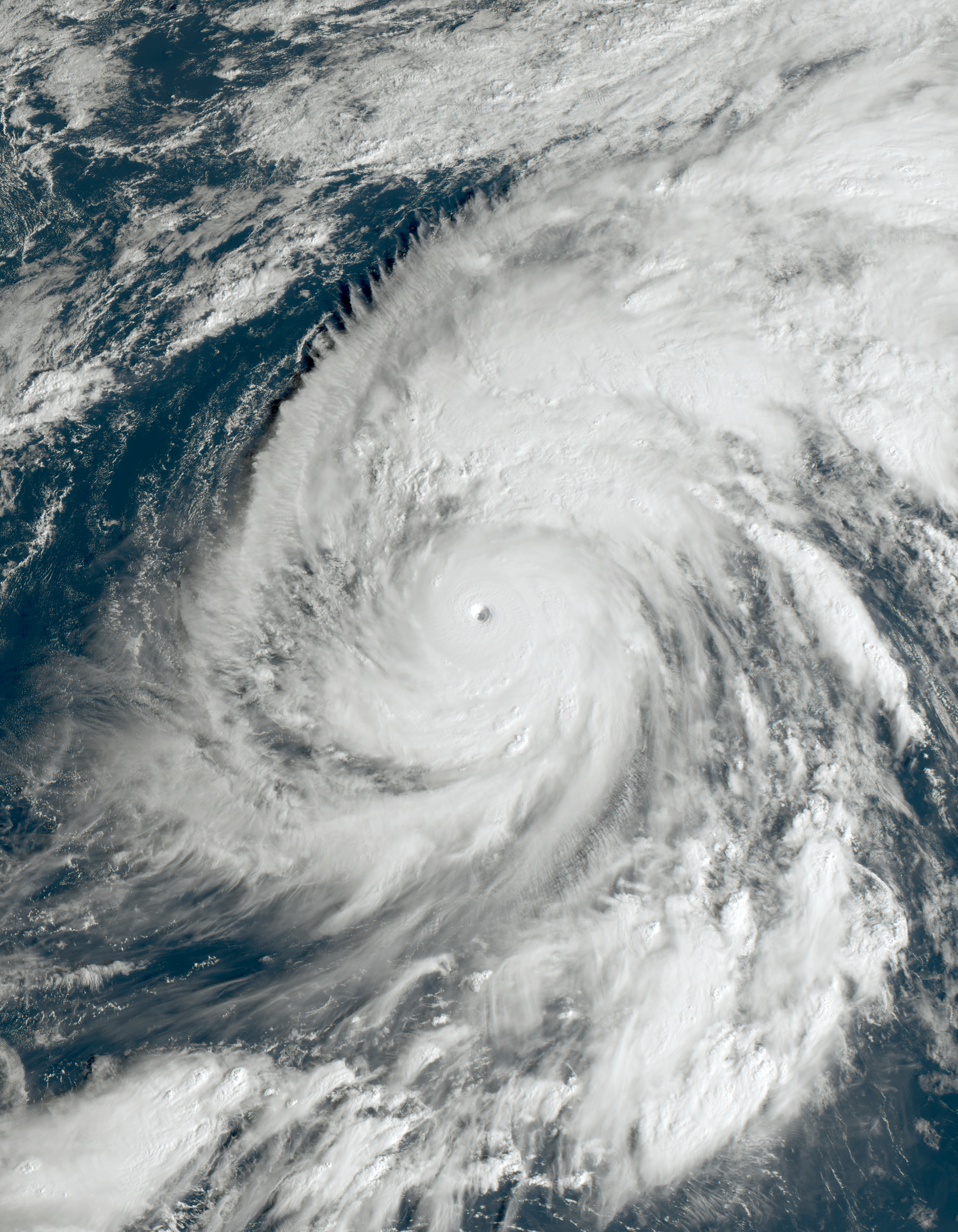
Typhoon Bolaven

October was slightly active, featuring thirteen systems with twelve of them being named. In the Atlantic, Tropical Storm Sean formed off the coast of Africa. Hurricane Tammy would later form, and make landfall on the Leeward Islands, before intensifying into a Category 2 hurricane.Tropical Depression Twenty-One would also form, though would shortly landfall on Central America. In the Eastern Pacific, Hurricanes Lidia, Norma, Otis and Tropical Storms Max and Pilar formed, with all storms except Pilar made landfall over Mexico, with Otis in particular being devastating, due to it making landfall on Acapulco as a Category 5 hurricane. In the Western Pacific, Typhoon Bolaven formed and rapidly intensified into a Category-5 equivalent super typhoon. Bolaven affecting Micronesia and Northern Mariana Islands, with no significant damage. Meanwhile, Sanba would also form shortly after, before making landfall on South China. In the North Indian Ocean, cyclones Tej and Hamoon formed, both making landfall on Yemen and Bangladesh, respectively. In the South Pacific, Cyclone Lola became the third cyclone of the year to impact Vanuatu, causing major damage.

Tropical cyclones formed in October 2023
Storm name	Dates active	Max wind km/h (mph)	Pressure (hPa)	Areas affected	Damage (USD)	Deaths	Refs
Lidia	October 3–11	220 (140)	942	Islas Marías, Western and southwestern Mexico	$79.2 million	2	
Bolaven	October 6–14	215 (130)	905	Federated States of Micronesia, Guam, Northern Mariana Islands, Bonin Islands	None	None	
Max	October 8–10	110 (70)	990	Southwestern Mexico	$38.6 million	2	
Sean	October 11–16	75 (45)	1004	None	None	None	
Sanba	October 17–20	65 (40)	1002	Vietnam, South China	$818 million	7	
Norma	October 17–23	215 (130)	939	Southern Baja California peninsula, Sinaloa	$28.4 million	3	
Tammy	October 18–28	175 (110)	965	Leeward Islands	Minimal	None	
Lola	October 19–26	215 (130)	930	Solomon Islands, Vanuatu	$352 million	4	
Tej	October 20–24	175 (110)	964	Socotra, Oman, Yemen	$1 million	2	
Hamoon	October 21–25	120 (75)	985	Bangladesh, Myanmar, West Bengal, Northeast India	$250 million	17	
Otis	October 22–25	270 (165)	922	Southwestern Mexico	$16 billion	52	
Twenty-One	October 23–24	45 (30)	1007	Central America	Unknown	None	
Pilar	October 28 – November 6	100 (65)	995	Central America	$45 million	4	

=== November ===
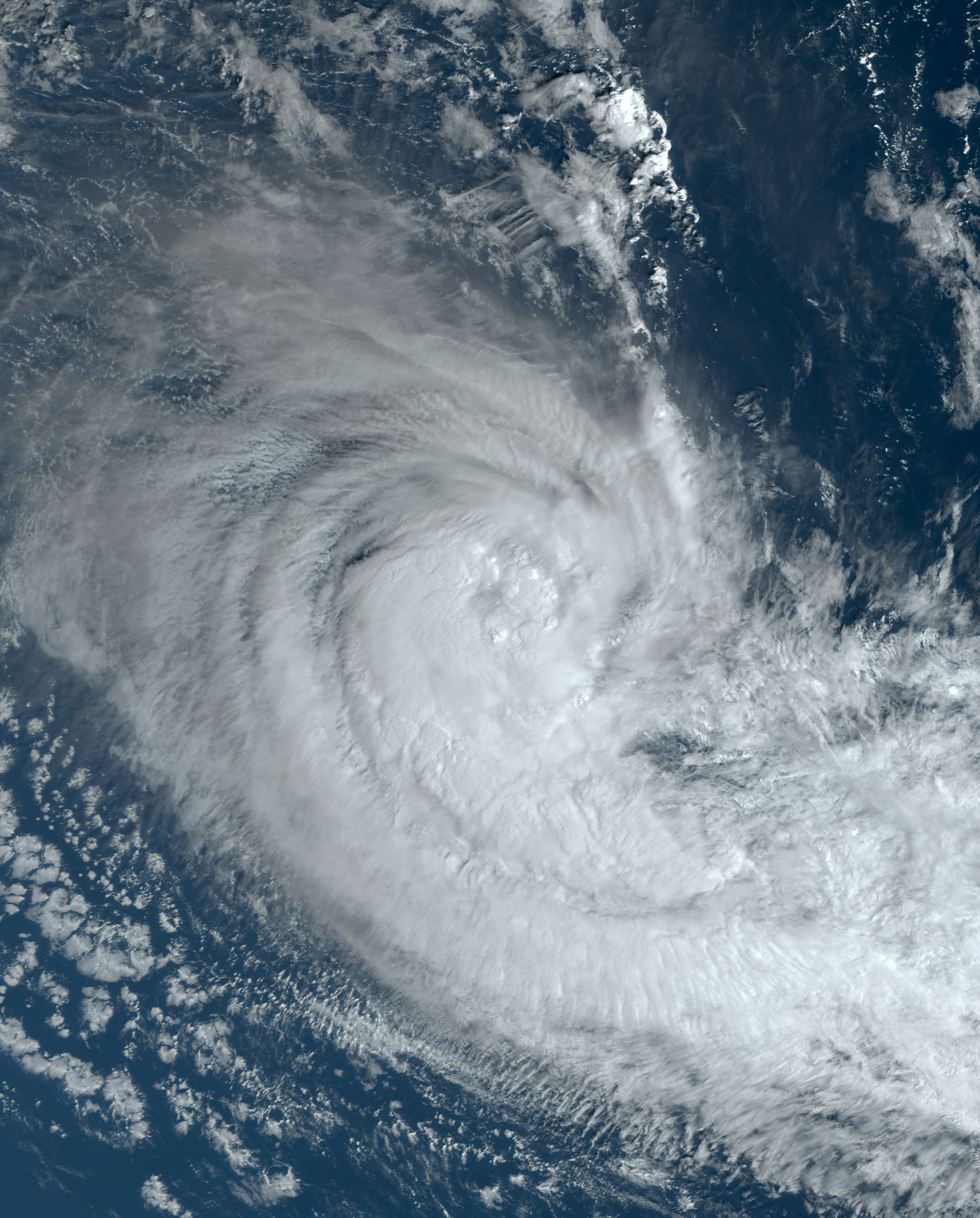
Cyclone Mal

November was unusually below average, with only four systems forming, three of them being named. In the South Pacific, Mal formed, then affected Fiji. Peaking as a category-3 severe tropical cyclone, it became the strongest storm of the month. In the Western Pacific, 17W formed, and caused no effect on land. It was followed by Midhili in the Indian Ocean which made landfall in Bangladesh. The month closed with Ramon, a storm from the Eastern Pacific.

Tropical cyclones formed in November 2023
Storm name	Dates active	Max wind km/h (mph)	Pressure (hPa)	Areas affected	Damage (USD)	Deaths	Refs
Mal	November 10–15	130 (80)	965	Fiji	Unknown	None	
17W	November 12–17	55 (35)	1004	None	None	None	
Midhili	November 14–18	95 (60)	996	India, Bangladesh	$109 million	10	
Ramon	November 21–26	75 (45)	1002	None	None	None	

=== December ===
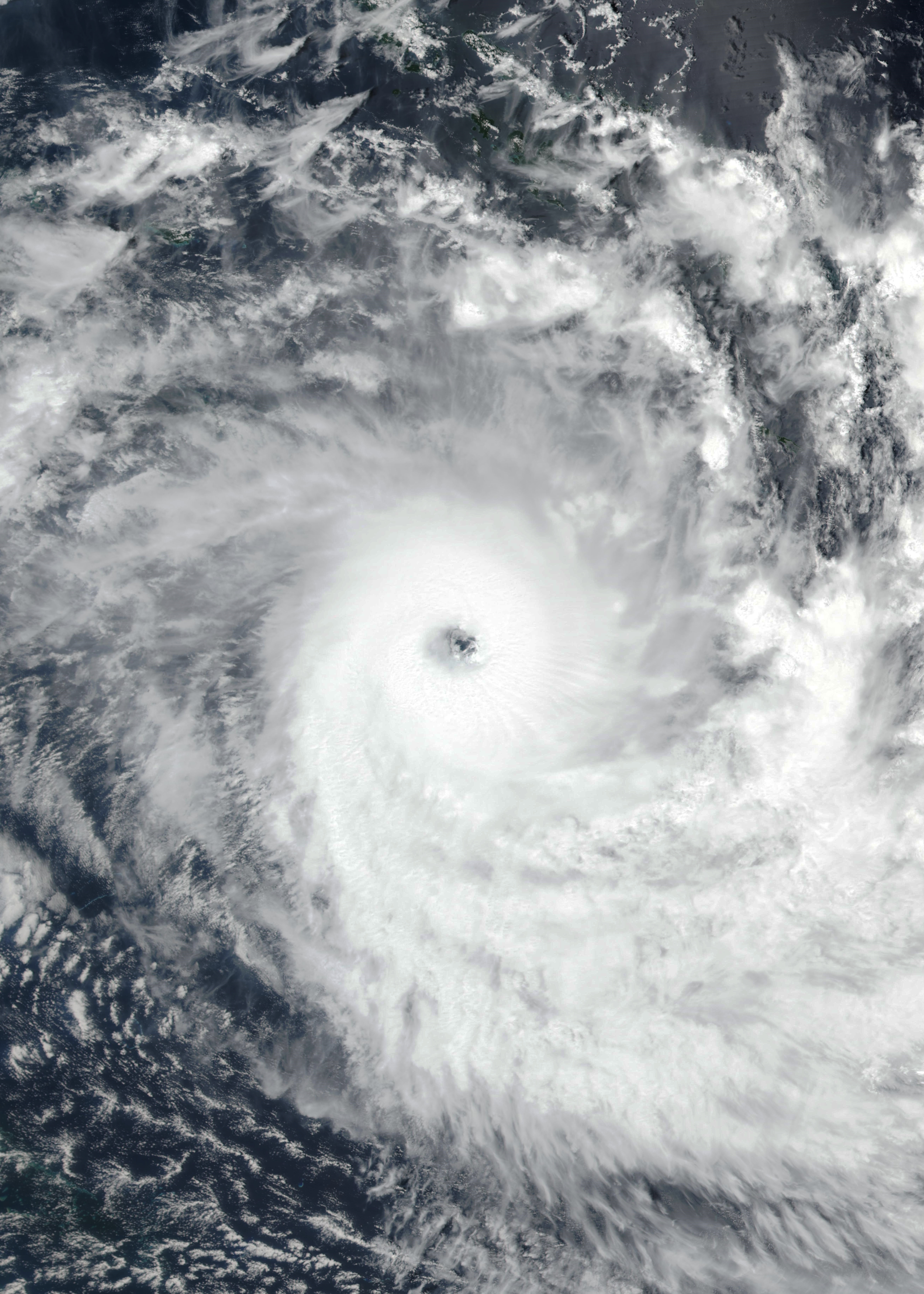
Cyclone Jasper

December was a below average month, with only four systems forming, all of them being named. In the Australian region, Cyclone Jasper formed, peaked as a severe tropical cyclone, and made landfall in Cairns, Australia, later becoming the wettest cyclone on record to impact the country. In the Western Pacific, Tropical Storm Jelawat formed, later bringing minor impacts to the Philippines before dissipating. It was followed by Cyclone Michaung in the North Indian Ocean, which made landfall in southern India. Finally, Tropical Storm Alvaro formed in the South-West Indian Ocean.

Tropical cyclones formed in December 2023
Storm name	Dates active	Max wind km/h (mph)	Pressure (hPa)	Areas affected	Damage (USD)	Deaths	Refs
Michaung	December 1–6	100 (65)	986	Tamil Nadu, Andhra Pradesh	$1.32 billion	17	
Jasper	December 2–13	215 (130)	926	Solomon Islands, Far North Queensland	$675 million	1	
Jelawat (Kabayan)	December 15–18	65 (40)	1002	Palau, Philippines	$43,200	None	
Alvaro	December 30, 2023 – January 3, 2024	120 (75)	982	Mozambique, Madagascar	Unknown	19	

== Global effects ==
There are a total of nine tropical cyclone basins, seven are seasonal and two are non-seasonal, thus all seven basins except the Mediterranean and South Atlantic are active. In this table, data from all these basins are added. Deaths in parentheses are additional and indirect (an example of an indirect death would be a traffic accident).

Season name		Areas affected	Systems formed	Named storms	Hurricane-force tropical cyclones	Damage (2023USD)	Deaths	Ref
North Atlantic Ocean (Note: The wind speeds for this tropical cyclone/basin are based on the Saffir Simpson Scale which uses 1-minute sustained winds.)		New England, Canada, ABC Islands, Colombia, Nova Scotia, Florida, Cuba, Barbados, Windward Islands, Leeward Antilles, Yucatan Peninsula, Venezuela, United States, Hispaniola, Windward Islands, Nicaragua, Azores, Mexico, Cayman Islands, Turks and Caicos, Bermuda	21	20	7	>$4.23 billion	15 (4)	
Eastern and Central Pacific Ocean		Revillagigedo Islands, Western Mexico, Hawaii, Johnston Atoll, Southern Baja California Peninsula	20	17	10	≥ $17.14 billion	≥56 (10)	
Western Pacific Ocean (Note: Only systems that formed either before or on December 31, 2023 are counted in the seasonal totals.)		Brunei, Indonesia, Malaysia, Singapore, Palau, Federated States of Micronesia, Mariana Islands, Philippines, Taiwan, Japan, Russian Far East, Alaska, South China, Vietnam, China, South Korea, North Korea, Bonin Islands, Wake Island	28	16	11 (Note: According to the JMA, Hurricane Dora entered the West Pacific Basin and became Typhoon Dora on August 12.)	$39.168 billion	224	
North Indian Ocean (Note: The wind speeds for this tropical cyclone/basin are based on the IMD Scale which uses 3-minute sustained winds.)		Sri Lanka, Andaman and Nicobar Islands, Myanmar, Bangladesh, Yunnan, China, Pakistan, West Bengal, Jharkhand, Odisha, Bihar, Chhattisgarh, Saudi Arabia, Yemen, Oman, Sri Lanka	9	6	4	$4.06 billion	511	
South-West Indian Ocean	January – June (Note: Only systems that formed either on or after January 1, 2023 are counted in the seasonal totals.) (Note: The wind speeds for this tropical cyclone are based on Météo-France, which uses wind gusts.)	Mascarene Islands, Madagascar, Mozambique, Zimbabwe, Malawi	3	4 (Note: Although three systems formed in this basin, there are four named storms because after Tropical Low 11U moved into this basin, it was given a name, Dingani, by the MFR.)	4 (Note: According to the BoM, Cyclone Freddy entered the South-West Indian ocean basin from the Australian Region on February 14, 2023)	$1,55 billion	1,483	
South-West Indian Ocean	July – December	Mozambique, Madagascar	1	1	—N/a	—N/a	—N/a	
Australian region	January – June	New Caledonia, Northern Australia, Norfolk Island	14	4	4	$10.2 million	0 (8)	
Australian region	July – December	Queensland, Northern Territory, Western Australia	1	1	1	$670 million	1	
South Pacific Ocean	January – June	New Caledonia, New Zealand, Vanuatu	11	4	2	>$11.06 billion	15 (2)	
South Pacific Ocean	July – December	Vanuatu, Solomon Islands, New Caledonia, New Zealand	2	2	2	$352 million	4	
South Atlantic Ocean		Rio de Janeiro	1	—N/a	—N/a	—N/a	—N/a	
Mediterranean Sea		Greece, Italy, Libya	1	1	—N/a	>$21.14 billion	5,951	
Worldwide		(See above)	112 (Note: The sum of the number of systems in each basin will not equal the number shown as the total. This is because when systems move between basins, it creates a discrepancy in the actual number of systems.)	76	45	> $99.02 billion	8,255 (26)	

== See also ==
- Tropical cyclones by year
- List of earthquakes in 2023
- Tornadoes in 2023
- Weather of 2023
