= Cyclone Tej =

North Indian Ocean cyclone in 2023

Extremely Severe Cyclonic Storm Tej
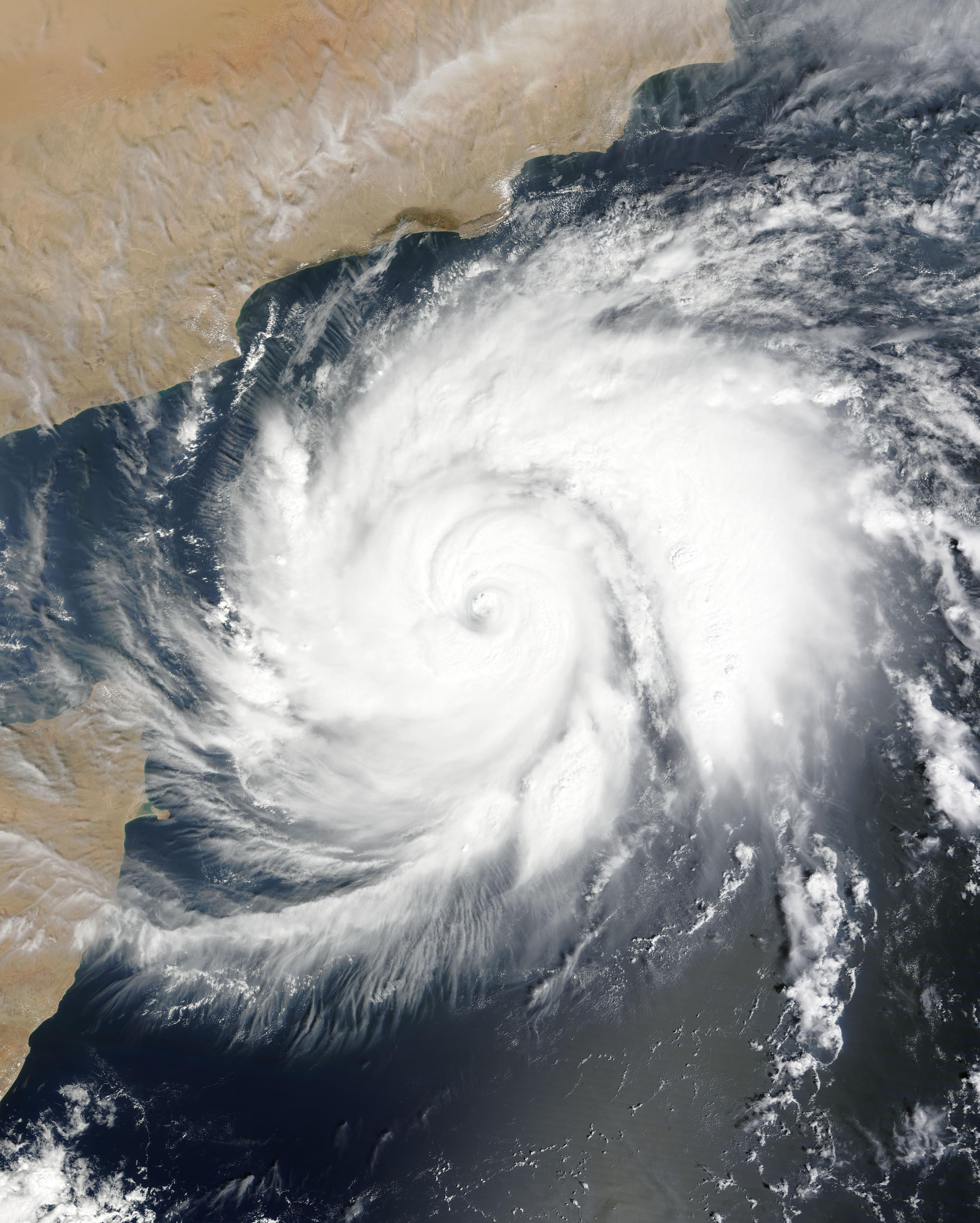
- Cyclone Tej at peak intensity southeast of Socotra on October 21

Meteorological history
- Formed: October 20, 2023
- Dissipated: October 24, 2023

Extremely severe cyclonic storm
- 3-minute sustained (IMD)
- Highest winds: 175 km/h (110 mph)
- Highest gusts: 205 km/h (125 mph)
- Lowest pressure: 964 hPa (mbar); 28.47 inHg

Category 3-equivalent tropical cyclone
- 1-minute sustained (SSHWS/JTWC)
- Highest winds: 195 km/h (120 mph)
- Highest gusts: 230 km/h (145 mph)
- Lowest pressure: 958 hPa (mbar); 28.29 inHg

Overall effects
- Fatalities: 2
- Missing: Unknown
- Damage: >$1 million (2023 USD)
- Areas affected: Socotra, Yemen, Oman, Saudi Arabia
- Part of the 2023 North Indian Ocean cyclone season

Extremely Severe Cyclonic Storm Tej (Note: The name Tej (Hindi: तेज; [teːd͡ʒ]) was contributed by India and means "energy, vigor" in Hindi.) was a strong tropical cyclone that formed over the central-south Arabian Sea and made landfall on Yemen. It was the first cyclone to make landfall in the nation since Cyclone Luban of 2018. The sixth depression and the third named cyclonic storm of the season, Tej coexisted with Cyclone Hamoon in the Bay of Bengal, a rare phenomenon not seen since 2018. The cyclone then took a northwestward track in the Arabian Sea and made landfall in Al Mahrah Governorate of Yemen between 23 and 24 October 2023, bringing significant rainfall and flooding across the eastern half of the country and western parts of Oman. Damages are estimated to be greater than US$1 million.

== Meteorological history ==
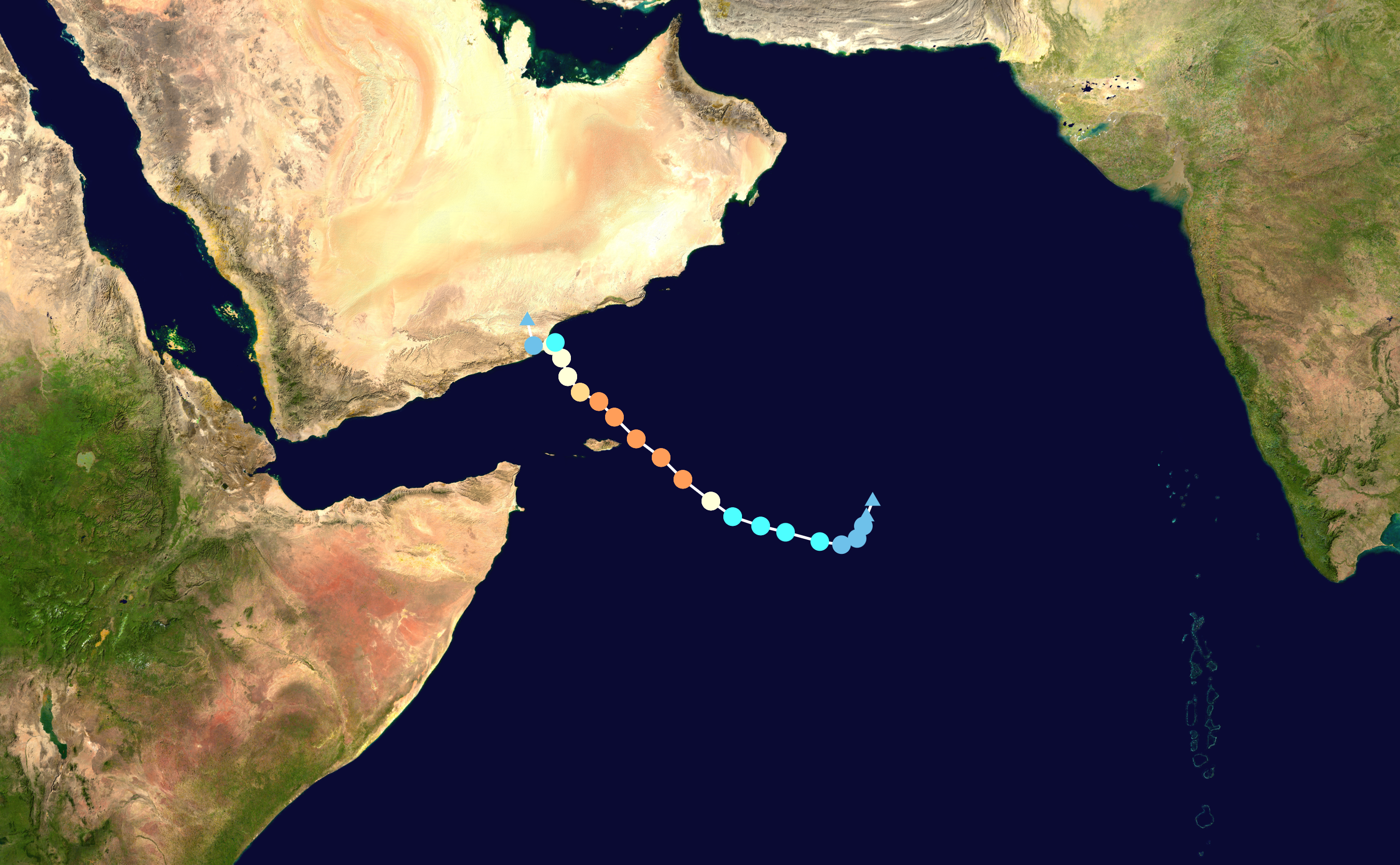
Map plotting the storm's track and intensity, according to the Saffir–Simpson scale Map key Saffir–Simpson scale Tropical depression (≤38 mph, ≤62 km/h) Tropical storm (39–73 mph, 63–118 km/h) Category 1 (74–95 mph, 119–153 km/h) Category 2 (96–110 mph, 154–177 km/h) Category 3 (111–129 mph, 178–208 km/h) Category 4 (130–156 mph, 209–251 km/h) Category 5 (≥157 mph, ≥252 km/h) Unknown Storm type Tropical cyclone Subtropical cyclone Extratropical cyclone, remnant low, tropical disturbance, or monsoon depression

On 16 October 2023, the India Meteorological Department (IMD) began monitoring for the formation of a cyclonic circulation in the Arabian Sea. In the Arabian Sea, relatively high ocean temperatures, indicating a positive Indian Ocean Dipole, created favourable conditions for tropical cyclogenesis. A cyclonic circulation formed over the Arabian Sea on 16 October. A low-pressure area formed as a result of the cyclonic circulation on the morning of October 18. It intensified further on October 20, becoming a deep depression. On the same day, the system intensified into a Cyclonic Storm, receiving the name Tej. As Tej moved northwestward, it encountered a very favorable environment, conducive for rapid intensification, allowing Tej to strengthen into a Category 3 tropical cyclone on October 22. After undergoing an eyewall replacement cycle, Tej weakened and made landfall over Al Mahrah Governorate between 23 and 24 October 2023.

== Preparations ==
=== Oman ===
Oman's Salalah port temporarily closed from October 22 as Tej approached. The Oman News Agency reported the country's authorities' decision to grant a holiday to employees in the public and private sectors, in the Dhofar Governorate, and the Al Jazir Wilayat in the Al Wusta Governorate, in anticipation of the cyclone. Oman's National Committee for Emergency Situations Management evacuated residents from the Hallaniyat Islands and coastal regions in the states of Salalah, Rakhyut and Dhalkot. Shelters and accommodation for 15,000 people were prepared in the Dhofar Governorate. Flights between Muscat and Salalah airports were increased to facilitate movement during the cyclone.

=== Yemen ===
The Yemeni Coast Guard in the Hadhramaut Governorate announced that it was taking precautionary measures in anticipation of the arrival of Tej. According to Saba News Agency, Al-Qatabi Ali Al-Farji, the Governor of Al-Mahra, called on the people to take precautions to avoid Tej's dangers. The governor warned citizens living in the depths of the valleys, farmers, and fishermen of the dangers of staying in low-lying places that are vulnerable to floods and hurricane threats. He called on international and humanitarian organizations working in Al-Mahra to intervene. He also called on citizens to take the utmost caution with the onset of the effects of Tej's heavy rains and strong winds. In Shabwah Governorate, fishermen were warned not to go into the sea and were told to take necessary precautions. In Al Mahrah Governorate, The Office of Education in Al-Mahra also announced the closure of schools in the governorate due to Tej. President Rashid al-Alimi contacted the governorates of Hadhramout, Mahra, and Socotra and directed the government to support the efforts of the local authorities in preparing for the arrival of Tej. Authorities in eastern Yemen declared a state of emergency, suspended schools and told fishermen stay home. The warning also prompted Yemeni authorities in Hadramout, Mahra, Shabwa and Socotra to declare a state of emergency and issue regular updates to the public. Fishermen were ordered not to go to sea and were also told to empty their docked boats and move the vessels to safer locations, and people living in low-lying areas advised to move their cars and other possessions to safety. Hadramout Governor Mabkhout bin Madhi set up a committee to oversee preparations for rescue and storm relief operations, while the neighbouring governorate of Al Mahrah, set up an emergency committee to make plans for schools to house people forced to leave their homes in the event of severe damage from the cyclone.

== Impact ==
=== Oman ===
Tej struck Oman's Dhofar Governorate, with the National Multi-Hazards Early Warning Centre indicating an intensification of the cyclone. Expect heavy to very heavy rainfall (100–300 mm), leading to flooding in valleys and high waves (6–12 meters) on the Arabian Sea coast. The cyclone featured wind speeds around its centre of 95-110 knots. It came ashore near the coast of Dhofar on the evening of 23 October and the following morning, bringing heavy rain, strong winds (50-70 knots), and rough seas. Tropical rain clouds affected Dhofar Governorate, bringing varying levels of rainfall to Salalah, Sadah, Mirbat, and Taqah. Additionally, rough seas with waves ranging from 6 to 12 meters were expected along the Arabian Sea coast, posing a danger to coastal areas and creeks.

=== United Arab Emirates ===
Heavy rains hit parts of the UAE on October 22. Massive flooding was reported in an area south of Shawka, which is a town near the Oman border. On October 25, flooding occurred in the Al Faya region in Sharjah, which is located towards the east of UAE. Hailstones fell in an area north of Fujairah with mountainous roads flooded with rainwater.

=== Yemen ===
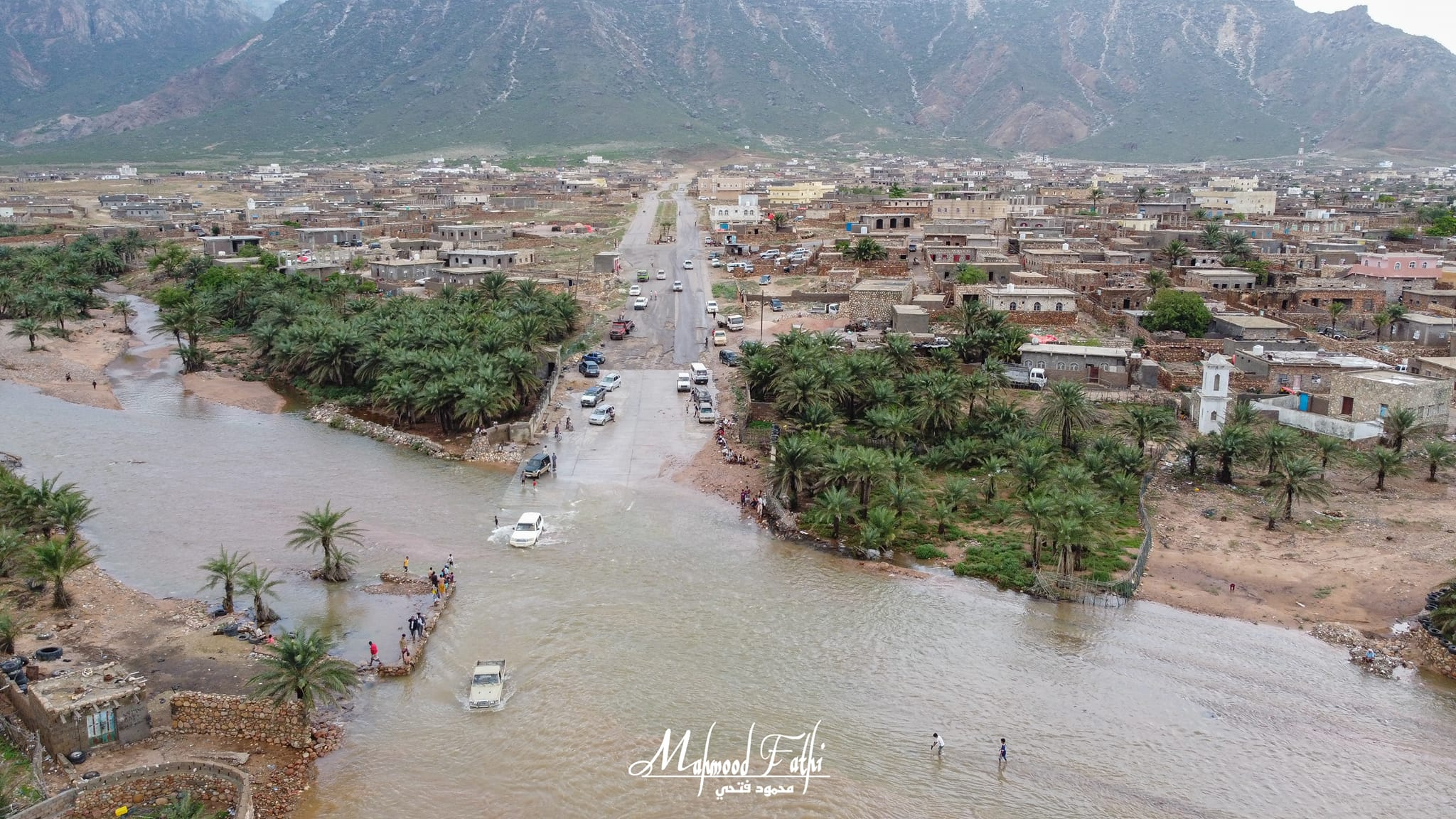
Flooding caused by Cyclone Tej on the island of Socotra, Yemen

==== Socotra ====
On October 22, Tej caused rough weather and torrential rains in Socotra, along with reported high waves, floods and landslides. Torrential rain on Saturday caused flooding on the island of Socotra as the cyclone made landfall. The flooding led to some roads in the governorate's capital city of Hadibu being cut, along with other areas in the archipelago. The Socotra Airport recorded 13 mm (0.51 in) of rain, with wind speeds reaching 25 kn (45 km/h; 30 mph) and gusts exceeding 25 kn (45 km/h; 30 mph). There was damage as a result of rain and wind, related to the blocking of roads and the bulldozing of farms, and the destruction of parts of some homes. Over 500 homes on the island sustained damage from the cyclone, displacing 192 households, primarily in Qulensya wa Abd al Kuri District. Three people overall were reported with minor injuries.

==== Mainland ====
The Yemen Red Crescent Society in Al-Mahra Governorate initiated evacuations due to Tej, along with the army, security forces, and health teams to move affected families to shelter centers amidst heavy rain and strong winds. Additionally, they also appealed to the Presidential Council, government, and Arab coalition for aircraft assistance to rescue flood-stranded individuals in Al-Ghaydah District, including Al-Ibri, Haft Al-Sada, Kalshat, and other areas. The storm flooded roads, submerged cars and forced Yemen Red Crescent volunteers in Al Mahra to temporarily suspend operations. Tej resulted in at least two deaths, alongside 150 injuries and 10,000 displaced people.

== See also ==
- Weather of 2023
- Tropical cyclones in 2023
- Deep Depression ARB 02 (2008)
- Cyclone Chapala (2015)
- Cyclone Megh (2015)
- Cyclone Mekunu (2018)
