= Cyclone Midhili =

North Indian Ocean cyclone in 2023

Severe Cyclonic Storm Midhili
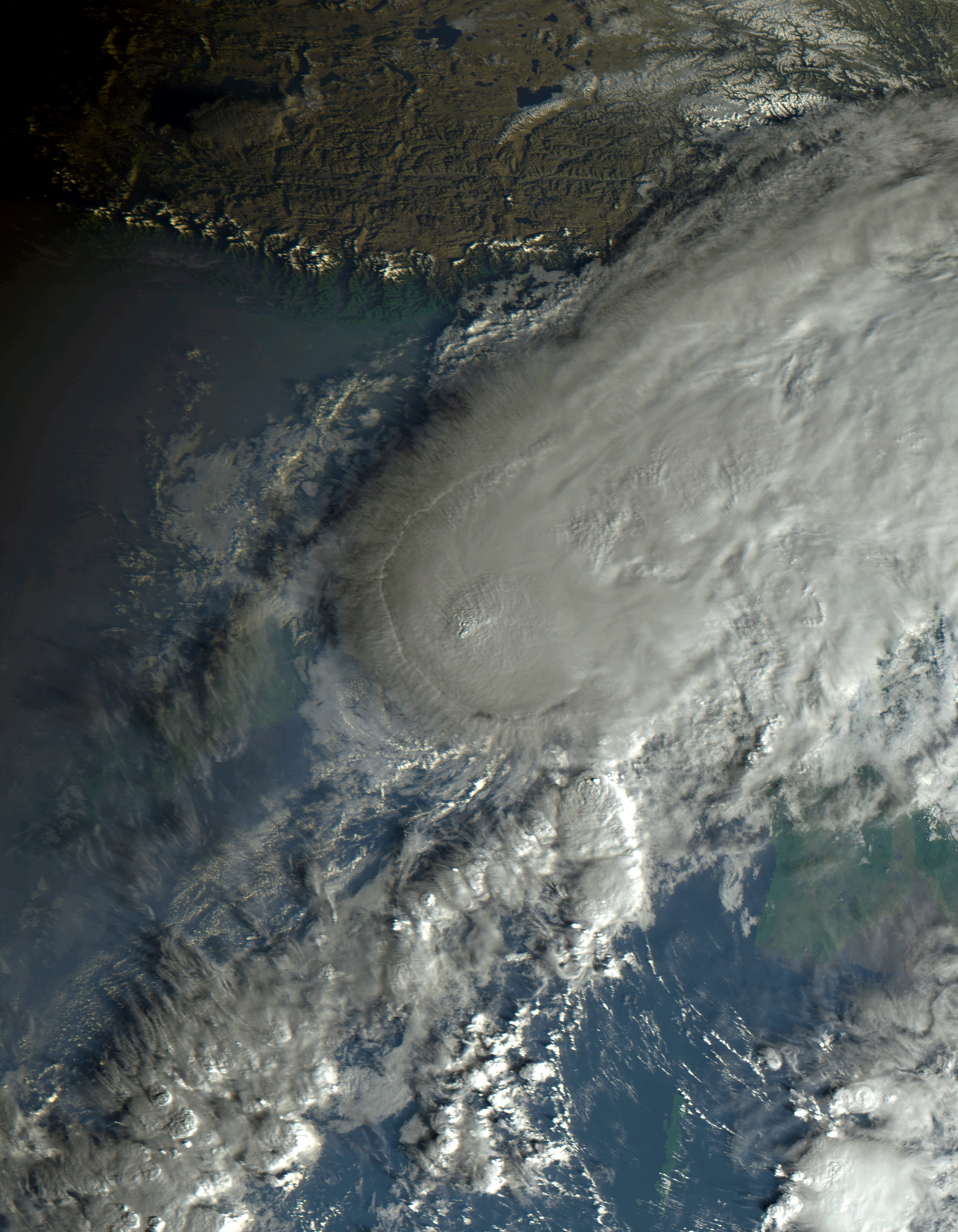
- Cyclone Midhili approaching Bangladesh early on 17 November

Meteorological history
- Formed: 15 November 2023
- Dissipated: 18 November 2023

Severe cyclonic storm
- 3-minute sustained (IMD)
- Highest winds: 95 km/h (60 mph)
- Lowest pressure: 996 hPa (mbar); 29.41 inHg

Tropical storm
- 1-minute sustained (SSHWS/JTWC)
- Highest winds: 75 km/h (45 mph)
- Lowest pressure: 995 hPa (mbar); 29.38 inHg

Overall effects
- Fatalities: 10 total
- Missing: 25
- Damage: $109 million (2023 USD)
- Areas affected: Bangladesh, Northeast India
- IBTrACS /
- Part of the 2023 North Indian Ocean cyclone season

Severe Cyclonic Storm Midhili (Note: The name Midhili (Dhivehi: މިދިލި; [mid̪ili]) was contributed by the Maldives and refers to the tropical almond (Terminalia catappa) in Dhivehi.) was a tropical cyclone which impacted Bangladesh and Northeast India in mid-November 2023. The fifth named storm of the annual North Indian Ocean cyclone season, Midhili formed as a low-pressure area in the southeastern Bay of Bengal on 14 November. The system tracked west-northwest but turned northward on the next day. The system tracked north-northeast on 16 November and continued to gain strength. Early on 17 November, the system attained cyclonic storm statue and received the name Midhili. Midhili further strengthened to a severe cyclonic storm, just before making landfall in Patuakhali District of Bangladesh. The cyclone weakened immediately after landfall, and dissipated on the next day over Tripura, India.

Warnings were issued to several ports of Bangladesh. Port operations were suspended, and vessels were shifted to safe locations. Flights and ship vessels' journeys were cancelled in advance of the cyclone, which led to hundreds of people being stranded. Midhili brought strong winds and heavy rains to Bangladesh and triggered flooding. Farmlands were inundated, resulting in massive crop damage. Over 160,000 farmers were affected by the cyclone. Electric wires were broken by fallen trees, which blocked the road, and interrupted train services and electricity supply. Many places in Bangladesh experienced power outages. Over 1,400 houses were damaged or destroyed. Midhili killed ten people and 25 others were missing in Bangladesh, while damage in brickfield industry reached $109 million (2023 USD). Its remnants moved into Tripura, brought rainfalls and caused crop damage, but no fatalities were reported in the state.

== Meteorological history ==
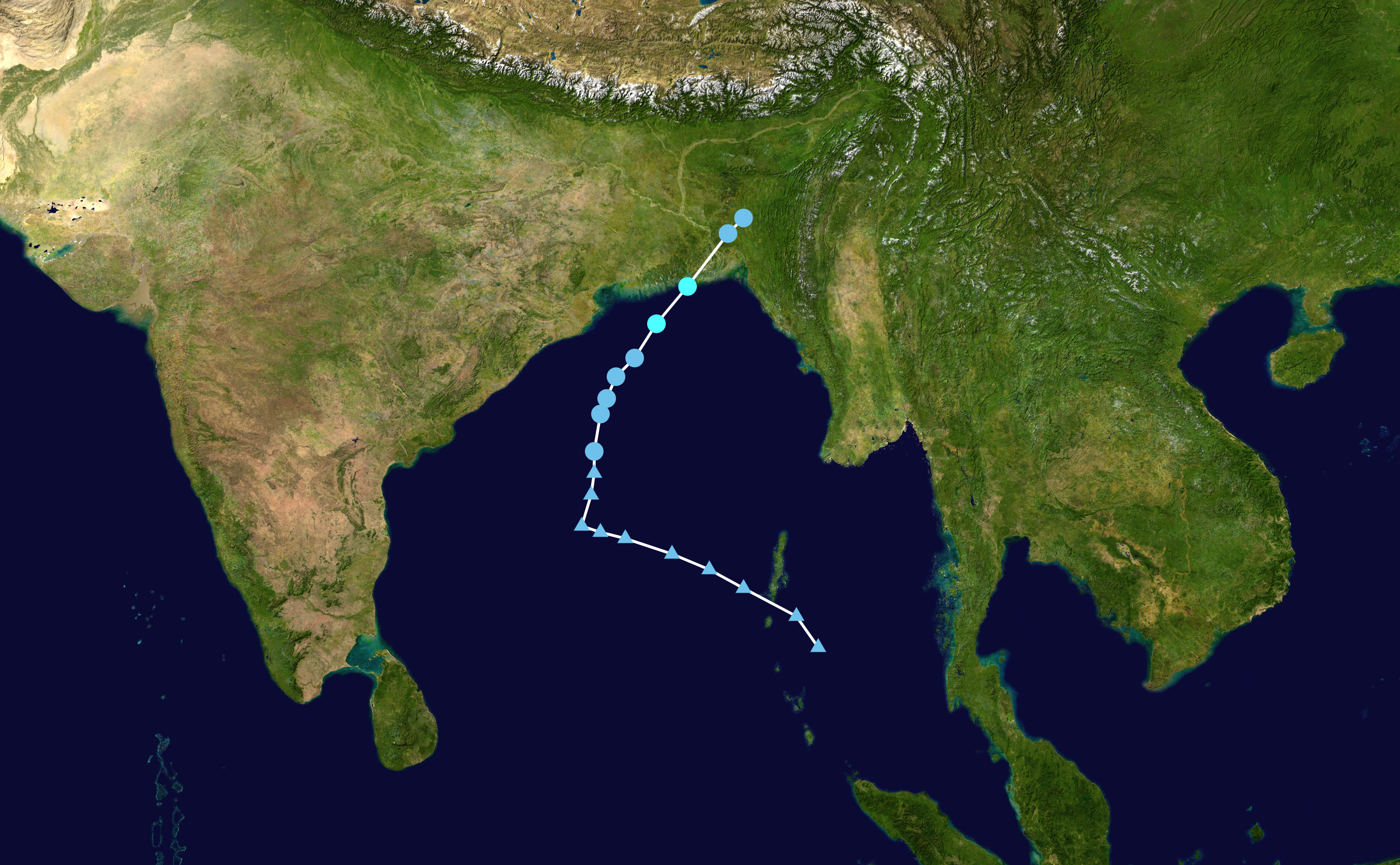
Map plotting the storm's track and intensity, according to the Saffir–Simpson scale Map key Saffir–Simpson scale Tropical depression (≤38 mph, ≤62 km/h) Tropical storm (39–73 mph, 63–118 km/h) Category 1 (74–95 mph, 119–153 km/h) Category 2 (96–110 mph, 154–177 km/h) Category 3 (111–129 mph, 178–208 km/h) Category 4 (130–156 mph, 209–251 km/h) Category 5 (≥157 mph, ≥252 km/h) Unknown Storm type Tropical cyclone Subtropical cyclone Extratropical cyclone, remnant low, tropical disturbance, or monsoon depression

On 14 November, the Indian Meteorological Department (IMD) noted a low-pressure area formed over the southeastern Bay of Bengal, near the Andaman and Nicobar Islands and tracked west-northwest. Early on the next day, the IMD designated it as a depression. The Joint Typhoon Warning Center (JTWC) also noted the low on the same day. The system benefited from strong poleward outflow, warm sea surface temperature of 28–29 °C (82–84 °F) and low wind shear. Despite the center was partly exposed, the JTWC believed that the system would become a tropical cyclone in a day or two. The system gradually turned northward on that day. Early on 16 November, the IMD upgraded the system to a deep depression as it turned north-northeast. Despite the center became completely exposed due to strong wind shear, the JTWC still issued a Tropical Cyclone Formation Alert to the system. The JTWC upgraded it to a tropical storm and designated as 07B. At 00:00 UTC 17 November, the IMD upgraded the system to a cyclonic storm, and assigned the name Midhili. The circulation appeared to be slightly elongated, but deep convection burst over the northern part of the cyclone. Strong wind shear continued to affect Midhili, but warm waters and strong poleward outflow allowed the cyclone to strengthen slightly. Midhili accelerated northeastward as it situated at the western edge of a subtropical ridge. Although the cyclone remained disorganised, the IMD upgraded Midhili to a severe cyclonic storm at 09:00 UTC. Between 3 p.m. and 4 p.m. BST (09:00 and 10:00 UTC), Midhili made landfall near Khepupara at peak intensity. Midhili weakened immediately after landfall, and the cyclone weakened to a cyclonic storm at 12:00 UTC, while the JTWC issued its final warning three hours later. Midhili weakened to a depression early on 18 November, and soon dissipated over Tripura, India.

== Preparations ==
A map from the Emergency Response Coordination Centre about the potential impacts of Midhili

As Midhili approached, the Bangladesh Meteorological Department (BMD) issued the Danger Signal No. 6 for Port of Chittagong, and issued the Danger Signal No. 7 for the Port of Payra and Port of Mongla on 17 November, warned that winds of 62–88 km/h (39–55 mph) was expected to affect the ports. The Chittagong Port Authority issued an alert No. 3, which required suspension of cargo loading and unloading. Large vessels were sent to outer anchorage while lighter vessels remained anchored at a safer location. The Bangladesh Inland Water Transport Authority announced that all inland waterways were closed and water travels were suspended on 17 November to avoid any accidents during the cyclone. 700 people in St. Martin's Island and Teknaf were stranded.

In Agartala, five flights were cancelled in Maharaja Bir Bikram Airport on 17 November, while four flights were not allowed to land and needed to turn around. Over 500 people were stranded at the airport.

== Impact ==
=== Bangladesh ===
Midhili made landfall in southern Bangladesh in the afternoon (local time) of 17 November. Winds reached 102 km/h (63 mph) in Patuakhali. Bhola recorded 249 mm (9.8 in) in 24 hours, the highest rainfall across the nation. Chandpur and Barisal recorded 24-hour rainfall of 232 mm (9.1 in) and 221 mm (8.7 in) respectively. Ten people were reported dead after the cyclone. In Cox's Bazar, a mud wall collapsed due to heavy rains and killed four people. In Sandwip Upazila, an elderly man was dead after being hit by a fallen tree branch. A girl in Mirsharai Upazila was killed by a fallen tree at her home. A businessperson died in Basail Upazila, also due to a fallen tree. 300 fishermen on 20 fishing trawlers were missing in the Bay of Bengal after going out to the deep sea to catch fish. The Bangladesh Navy rescued numerous fisherman, though 25 of them were still missing as of 8 December. In Comilla, a young man was found dead after the lighter vessel carrying stones capsized due to Midhili. Two more people were killed by a fallen tree in the city.

Heavy rains from Midhili triggered flooding in Bangladesh. In Bhola District, 4,321 ha (10,680 acres) of crops were destroyed, which incurred a loss of ৳800 million (US$7.23 million). A farmer revealed that 20% of the Aman paddy was damaged by floodwaters. Nearly 500 houses were damaged or destroyed in the district. According to the Ministry of Agriculture, a total of 243,294 ha (601,190 acres) of crops were damaged, which affected 163,449 farmers and resulted in a loss of ৳3.87 billion (US$35 million). In Chandpur, a large tree fell down and broke the electric wires, which interrupted the vehicles and train services. A road near the Kazirbag Eco-Park was blocked by a fallen tree, which temporary interrupted train services and road communication. Numerous places experienced power outages, including Noakhali, Barguna District, Cox's Bazar, and Jhalokathi District. 1,111 houses were damaged across the nation, and 132 others were destroyed. Brickfields in Bangladesh suffered severe damage from Midhili, and the loss was amounted to ৳12 billion (US$109 million).

=== Northeast India ===
The remnants of Midhili brought rainfalls to Tripura, over 100,000 farmers were affected. They blamed the inadequate warnings from the local meteorological department and asked for compensation. 339 houses were damaged, in which 12 of them were destroyed. Total damage statewide was unknown, but no fatalities were reported.

== See also ==
- Weather of 2023
- Tropical cyclones in 2023
- List of Bangladesh tropical cyclones
- Cyclone Rashmi
- Cyclone Mora
- Cyclone Matmo–Bulbul
- Cyclone Sitrang
- Cyclone Remal
