= 2023 North Indian Ocean cyclone season =

Indian Ocean cyclone season

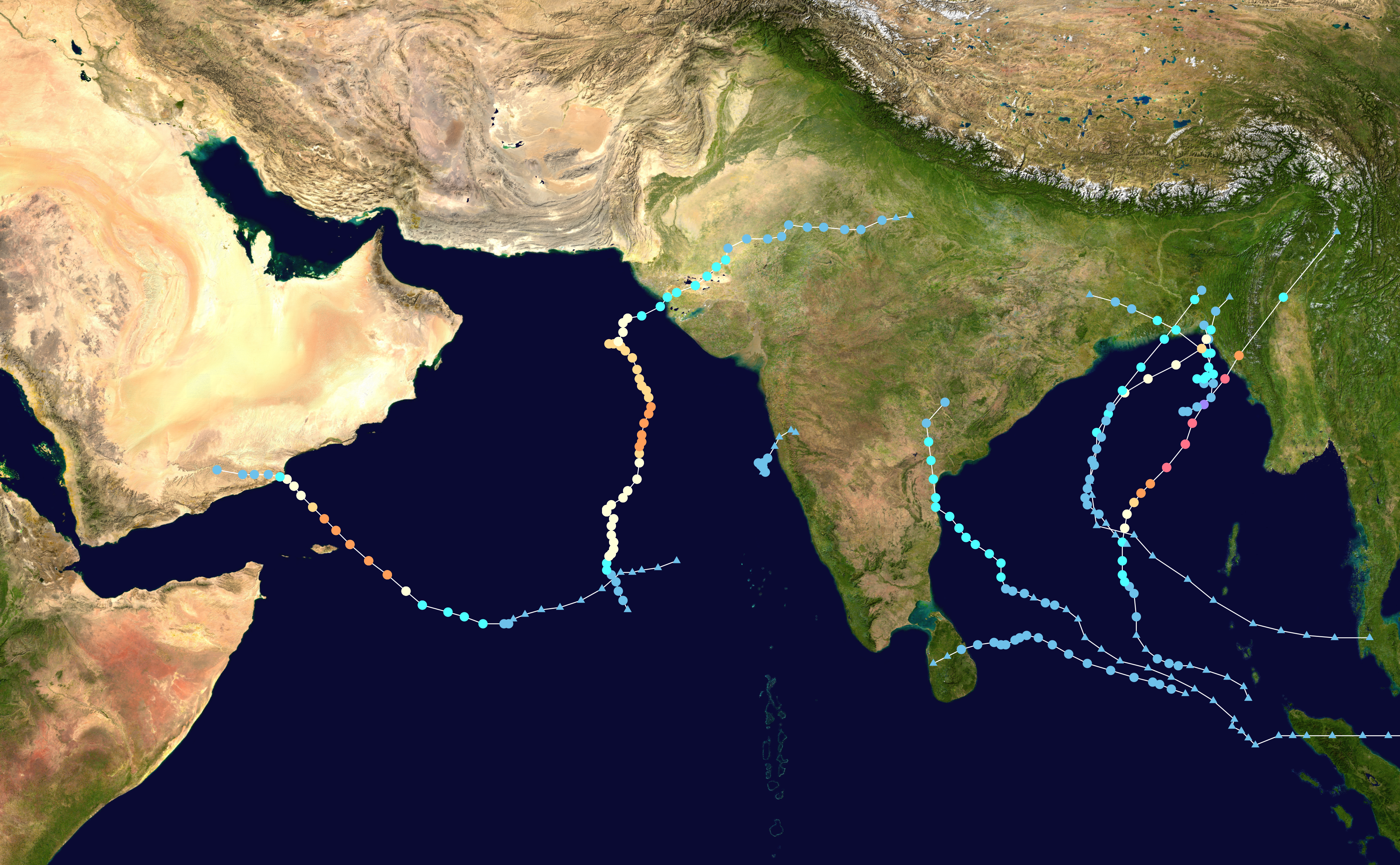
- Season summary map

Seasonal boundaries
- First system formed: 30 January 2023
- Last system dissipated: 6 December 2023

Strongest storm
- Name: Mocha
  - Maximum winds: 215 km/h (130 mph) (3-minute sustained)
  - Lowest pressure: 938 hPa (mbar)

Seasonal statistics
- Depressions: 9, 1 unofficial
- Deep depressions: 7, 1 unofficial
- Cyclonic storms: 6, 1 unofficial
- Severe cyclonic storms: 6 (record high, tied with 2019)
- Very severe cyclonic storms: 4
- Extremely severe cyclonic storms: 3 (record high, tied with 1999 and 2019)
- Super cyclonic storms: 0
- Total fatalities: 511 total
- Total damage: $4.07 billion (2023 USD)

Related articles
- 2023 Atlantic hurricane season; 2023 Pacific hurricane season; 2023 Pacific typhoon season

The 2023 North Indian Ocean cyclone season was an above-average and deadly season, becoming the most active since 2019, with nine depressions and six cyclonic storms forming. It was the deadliest since 2017, mostly due to Cyclone Mocha, and had the second-highest accumulated cyclone energy (ACE) in the basin, after the 2019 cyclone season, which was itself the second most active North Indian Ocean cyclone season on record in terms of cyclonic storms. The 2023 season also had the most extremely severe cyclonic storms on record, tying with 1999 and 2019. The North Indian Ocean cyclone season has no official bounds, but cyclones tend to form between April and December, with the peak from May to November. These dates conventionally delimit the period of each year when most tropical cyclones form in the northern Indian Ocean. However, a cyclone can form at any time during the year shown by an unnamed depression that affected Sri Lanka in January–February.

The scope of this article is limited to the Indian Ocean in the Northern Hemisphere, east of the Horn of Africa and west of the Malay Peninsula. There are two main seas in the North Indian Ocean — the Arabian Sea to the west of the Indian subcontinent, abbreviated ARB by the India Meteorological Department (IMD); and the Bay of Bengal to the east, abbreviated BOB by the IMD. The systems that form over land are abbreviated as LAND. The official Regional Specialized Meteorological Centre in this basin is the India Meteorological Department (IMD), while the Joint Typhoon Warning Center releases unofficial advisories for interest. On average, three to four cyclonic storms form in this basin every season.

== Season summary ==
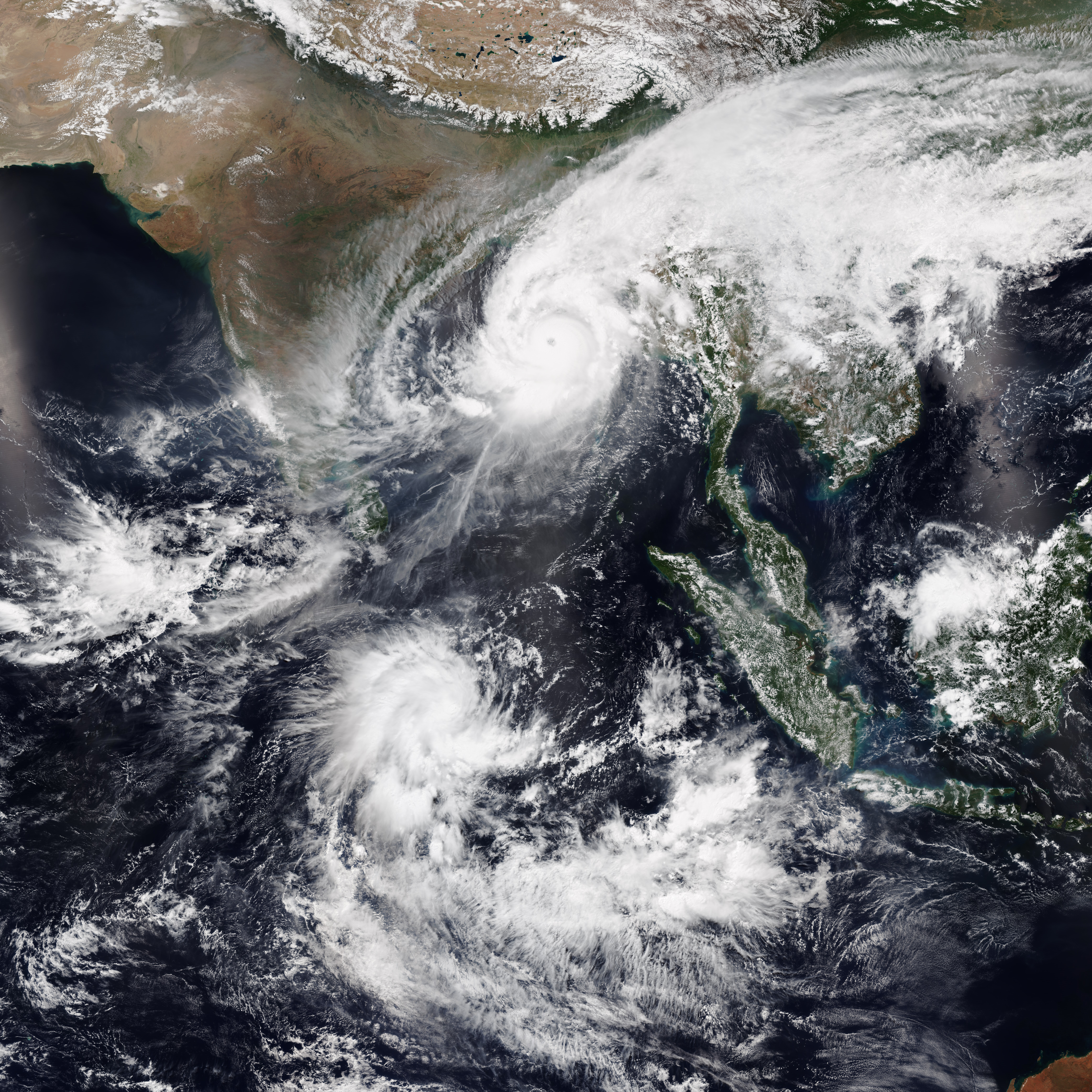
Extremely Severe Cyclonic Storm Mocha and a disturbance below the equator which would later become Fabien on May 13.

Nearing the end of January, a tropical depression classified as BOB 01 formed, becoming the first storm in the basin. The storm's formation makes it the first time since 2019 to see a storm develop in the month of January in the basin. BOB 01 was short-lived and dissipated after making landfall on Sri Lanka.

After almost four months of inactivity, the IMD began to monitor a disturbance which was located in the Bay of Bengal on 6 May. The system steadily improved and was upgraded into a Depression by the IMD with it being classified as BOB 02. Soon afterwards on 10 May, it intensified to a Deep Depression. On the next day, it strengthened into a Cyclonic Storm with the IMD naming the system Mocha. Mocha afterwards, began to rapidly intensify and reached its peak intensity as a Category 5-equivalent cyclone on 14 May. Mocha then made landfall just north of Sittwe, Myanmar as a Category 4-equivalent cyclone. The cyclone then rapidly weakened and was last noted over the Chinese province of Yunnan on 15 May. Mocha caused heavy damage across Myanmar and Bangladesh and killed at least 400 people. On 6 June, a Depression formed in the Arabian Sea, which was later named Biparjoy and rapidly intensified to a Category 1-equivalent cyclone. On 9 June, Tropical Storm 03B was designated by the JTWC in the Bay of Bengal. On 31 July, a low-pressure area developed into Tropical Storm 04B, which was designated by the JTWC. On 30 September, ARB 02 formed.

== Systems ==
=== Depression BOB 01 ===
- Depression (IMD)
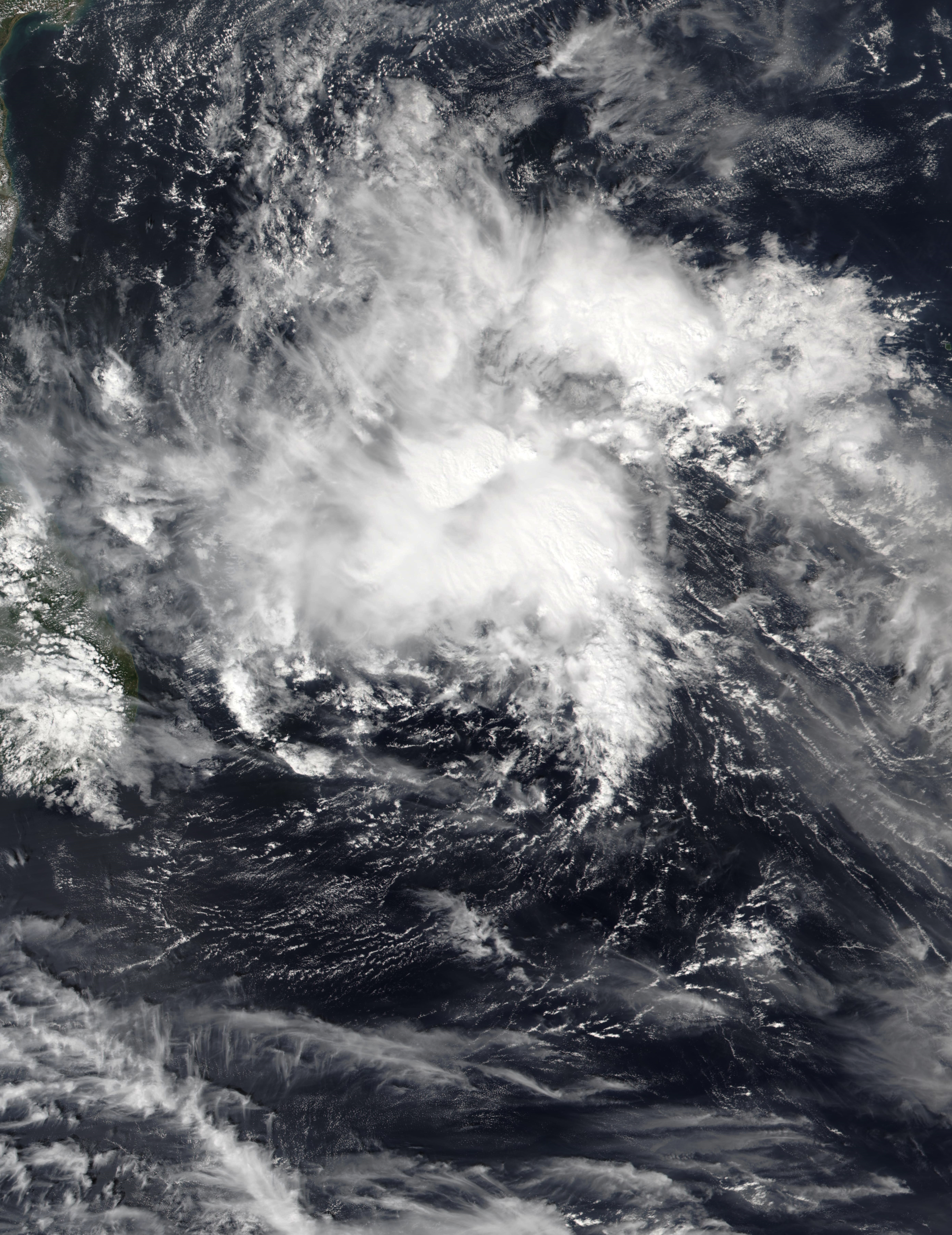
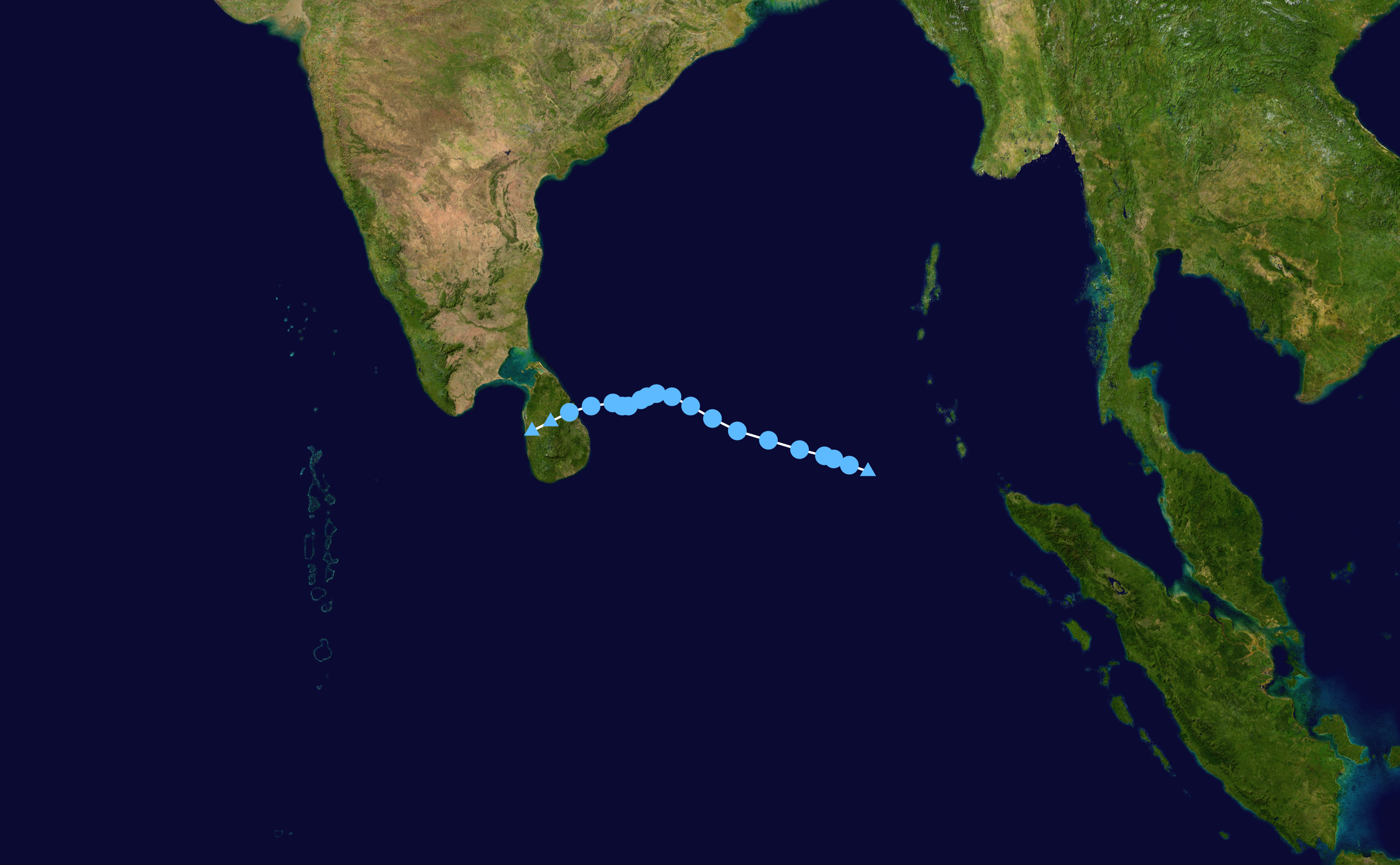
- Duration: 30 January – 2 February
- Peak intensity: 45 km/h (30 mph) (3-min); 1004 hPa (mbar)

On 25 January, a cyclonic circulation formed over the equatorial Indian Ocean and the adjoining Bay of Bengal. Under the influence of the cyclonic circulation, a low-pressure area formed on 27 January. It would significantly concentrate, becoming a well-marked low-pressure area on 29 January. The system would intensify further, resulting in the IMD recognizing it as a depression the next day. The JTWC would also issue a Tropical Cyclone Formation Alert (TCFA) for the system. However, increasing land interaction with Sri Lanka caused the JTWC to downgrade the system's chance for development to medium and subsequently canceling its TCFA. The disturbance finally weakened into a well-marked low pressure area over the Gulf of Mannar on 2 February.

=== Extremely Severe Cyclonic Storm Mocha ===
- Extremely severe cyclonic storm (IMD)
- Category 5 tropical cyclone (SSHWS)
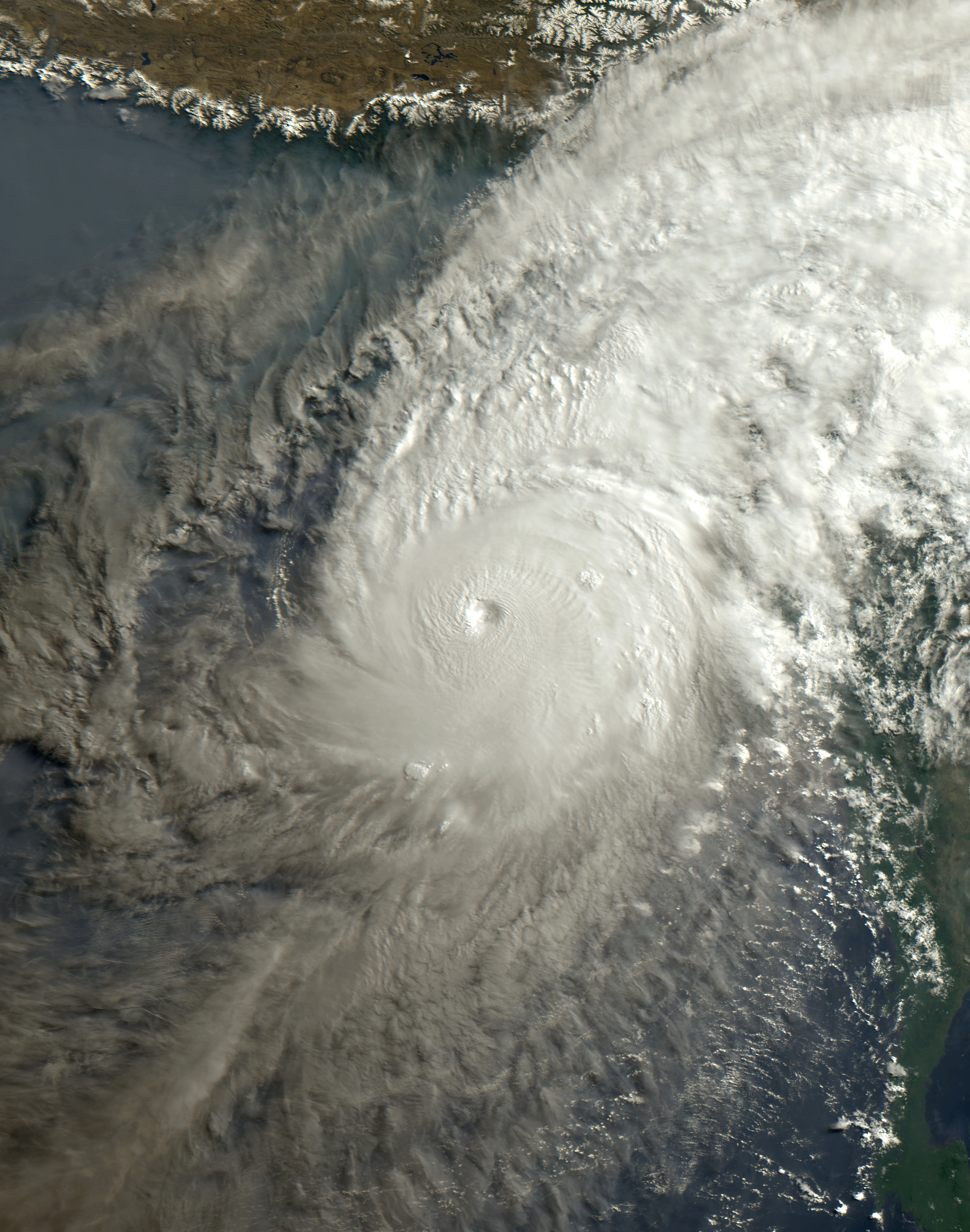
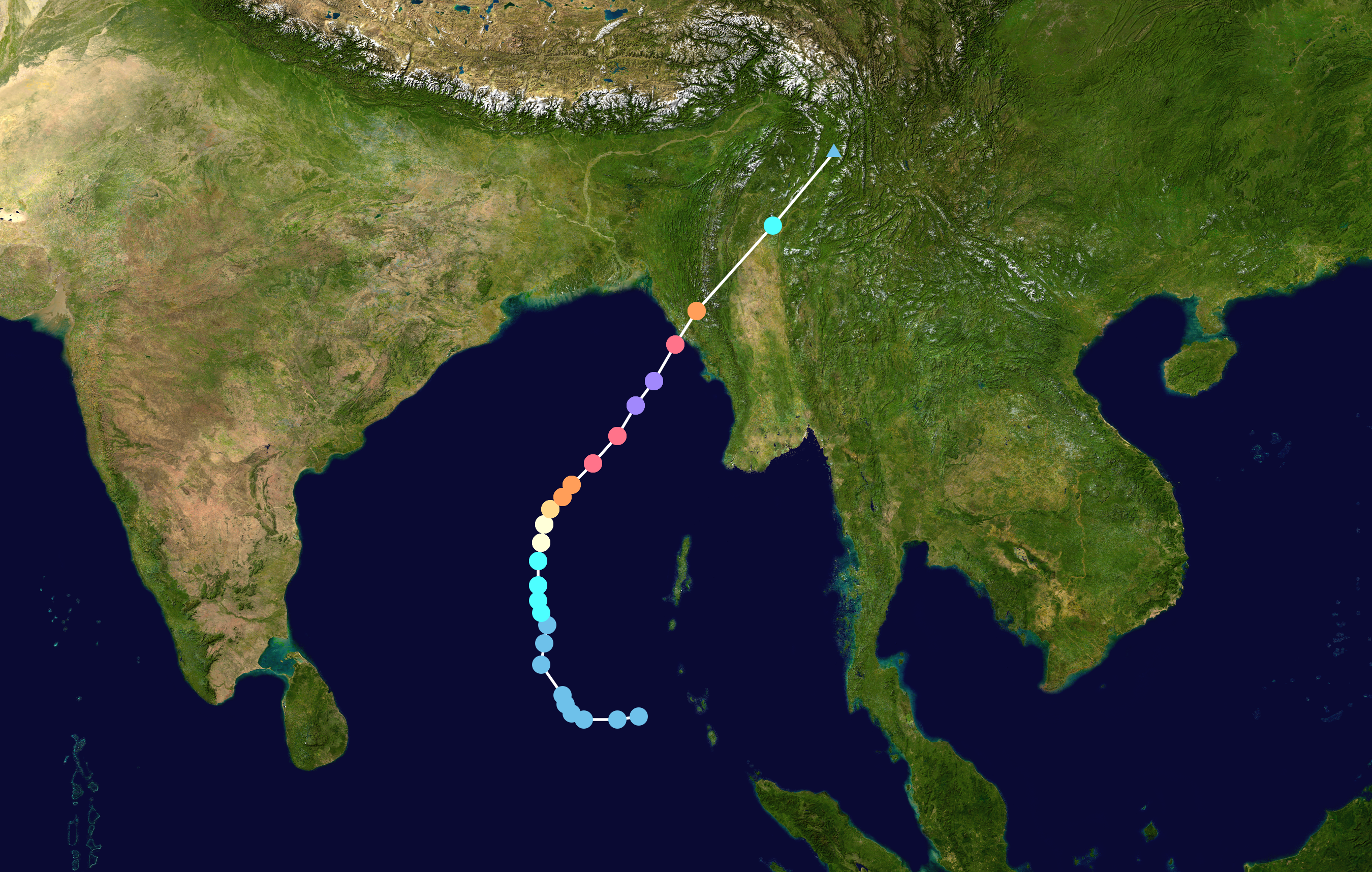
- Duration: 9 May – 15 May
- Peak intensity: 215 km/h (130 mph) (3-min); 938 hPa (mbar)

A circulation formed on 6 May over the Bay of Bengal as a result of the amplitude of the Madden–Julian oscillation (MJO), according to the IMD. The JTWC also began monitoring the system on 7 May, marking its flaring convection to the west of the circulation. On 9 May, the system was upgraded to a depression. The JTWC later issued a TCFA on the system as it was situated in very warm sea surface temperatures. The storm subsequently intensified into a deep depression at 03:00 UTC of 9 May, before upgrading further to a cyclonic storm on 11 May, attaining the name Mocha. (Note: The name Mocha (Arabic: مخا, [muxaː]) was contributed by Yemen and refers to the port city Mokha, where the coffee name comes from, in Arabic.) The JTWC followed suit in upgrading the system to tropical cyclone status the same day. Mocha quickly intensified to a severe cyclonic storm at 12:00 UTC after reaching winds of 105 km/h (65 mph). After forming an eye, Mocha became a very severe cyclonic storm on 12 May. Mocha rapidly intensified to an extremely severe cyclonic storm at 18:00 UTC, before undergoing an eyewall replacement cycle. After having completing the cycle on 13 May, Mocha rapidly intensified and reached a peak intensity as a Category 5-equivalent tropical cyclone the next day, shortly before the storm entered unfavourable conditions. Mocha weakened before making landfall near Sittwe, Myanmar. Mocha began to weaken swiftly after landfall due to Myanmar's terrain, with wind shear degrading the storm further. The system would be downgraded to a depression on 15 May, before becoming marked as a low-pressure area later that day.

The death toll from Cyclone Mocha varies significantly. ASEAN reported a total of 145 deaths, whereas the National Unity Government of Myanmar (NUG) stated that Mocha killed at least 463 people, including three indirect deaths in Bangladesh. The cyclone also injured 719 people and left 101 others missing. It caused about US$1.5 billion of damage in Myanmar.

=== Extremely Severe Cyclonic Storm Biparjoy ===
- Extremely severe cyclonic storm (IMD)
- Category 3 tropical cyclone (SSHWS)
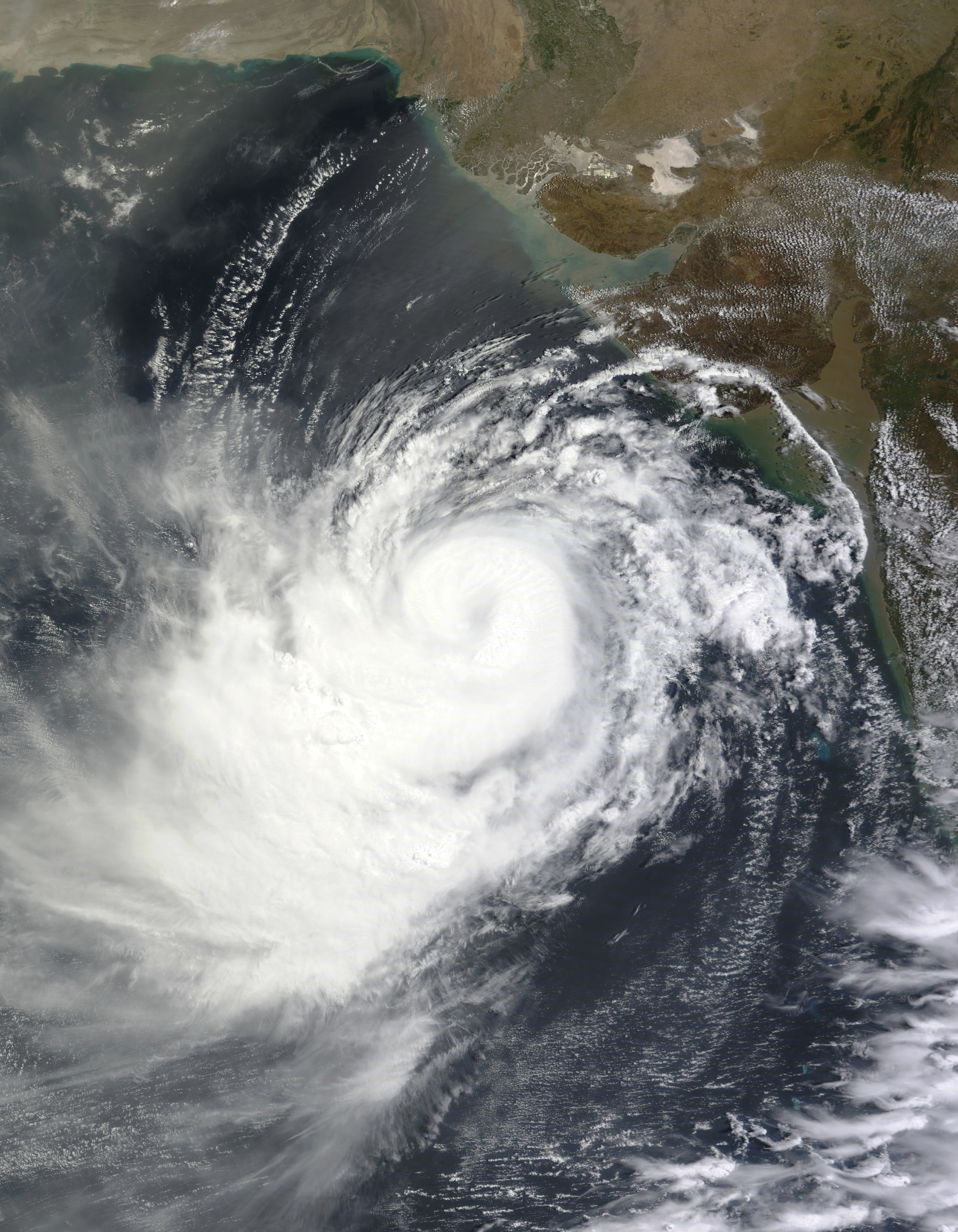
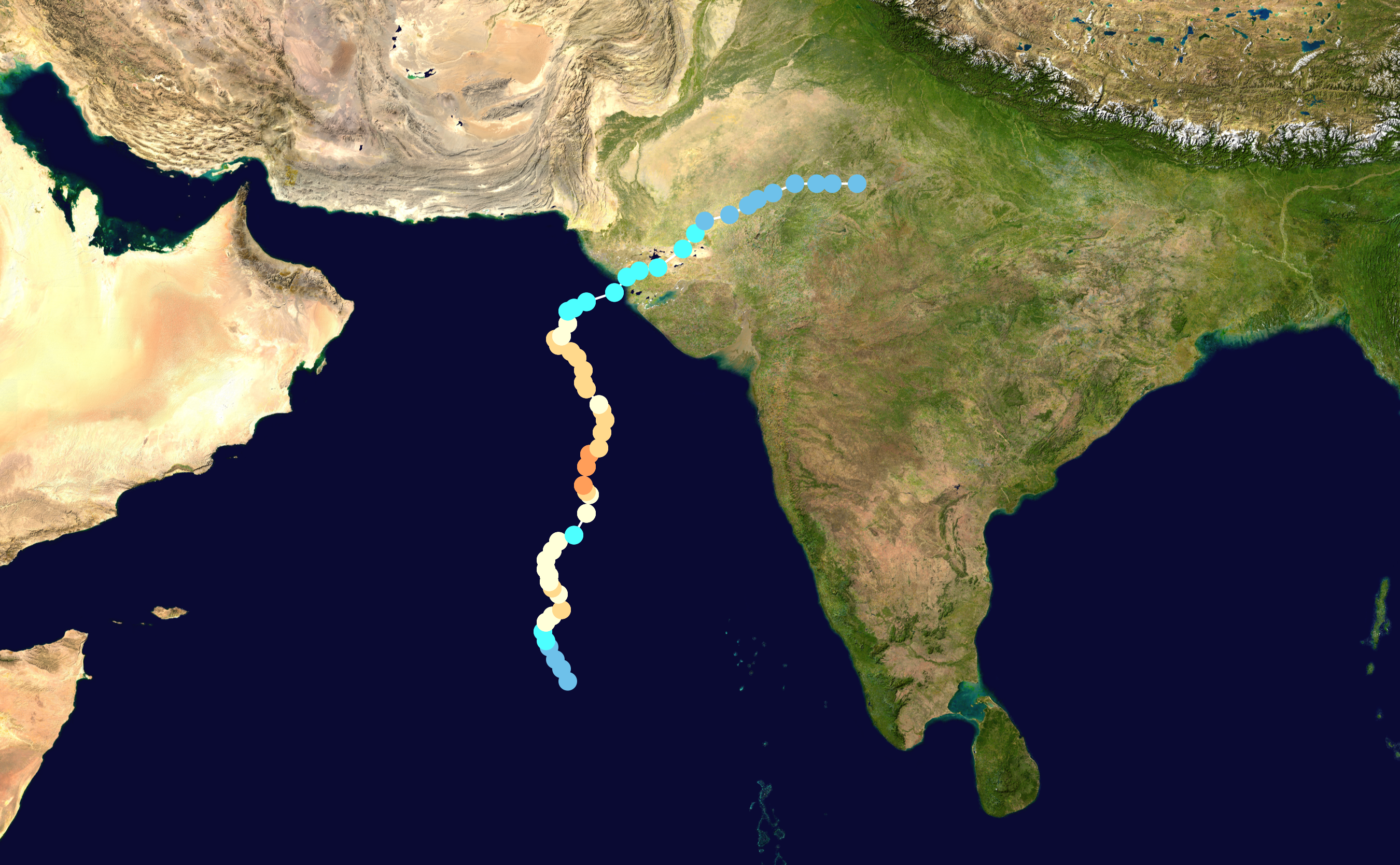
- Duration: 6 June – 19 June
- Peak intensity: 165 km/h (105 mph) (3-min); 958 hPa (mbar)

A cyclonic circulation formed over the Arabian Sea on 5 June. On the same day, a low-pressure area formed as a result of cyclonic circulation. The following day, it intensified significantly into a depression. The IMD upgraded the depression to a deep depression, and subsequently to Cyclonic Storm Biparjoy. (Note: The name Biparjoy (Bengali: বিপর্যয়, [bipɔɾdʒɔj]) was contributed by Bangladesh and means "disaster, calamity" in Bengali.) The JTWC subsequently classified it as Tropical Cyclone 02A. By 00:00 UTC on 7 June, the IMD upgraded the system to a severe cyclonic storm with winds of 100 km/h (65 mph). At the cloud tops Biparjoy warmed and the convective burst collapsed, resulting in an upper-level outflow from the storm and pushing it back towards its system core. Biparjoy was upgraded to a very severe cyclonic storm at 06:00 UTC, at which point the system became a Category 2-equivalent tropical cyclone. The cyclone suffered wind shear due to moderate easterly vertical wind, with the deep convection displaced from the LLCC. Biparjoy unexpectedly rapidly intensified and became a Category 3-equivalent cyclone on 11 June. Biparjoy reached its peak intensity as an extremely severe cyclonic storm, with maximum 3-minute sustained winds of 165 km/h (105 mph). The shear decreased and convective organization and areal extent increased. Biparjoy gradually weaken with convective banding over the northern semicircle. Biparjoy made landfall on 16 June near Naliya, India, with sustained winds of 95 km/h (60 mph). Shortly after its landfall, the JTWC discontinued warnings on the system. and was later marked as a low-pressure area by the IMD on 19 June, prompting the discontinuation of advisories on the system.

In Pakistan, 81,000 people were evacuated from the southeastern coast, and authorities established 75 relief camps at schools to provide assistance. At least 23 people were injured as well as 4,600 villages were affected by power outages in India. A total of 12 people were confirmed to have been killed by the storm.

=== Deep Depression BOB 03 ===
- Deep depression (IMD)
- Tropical storm (SSHWS)
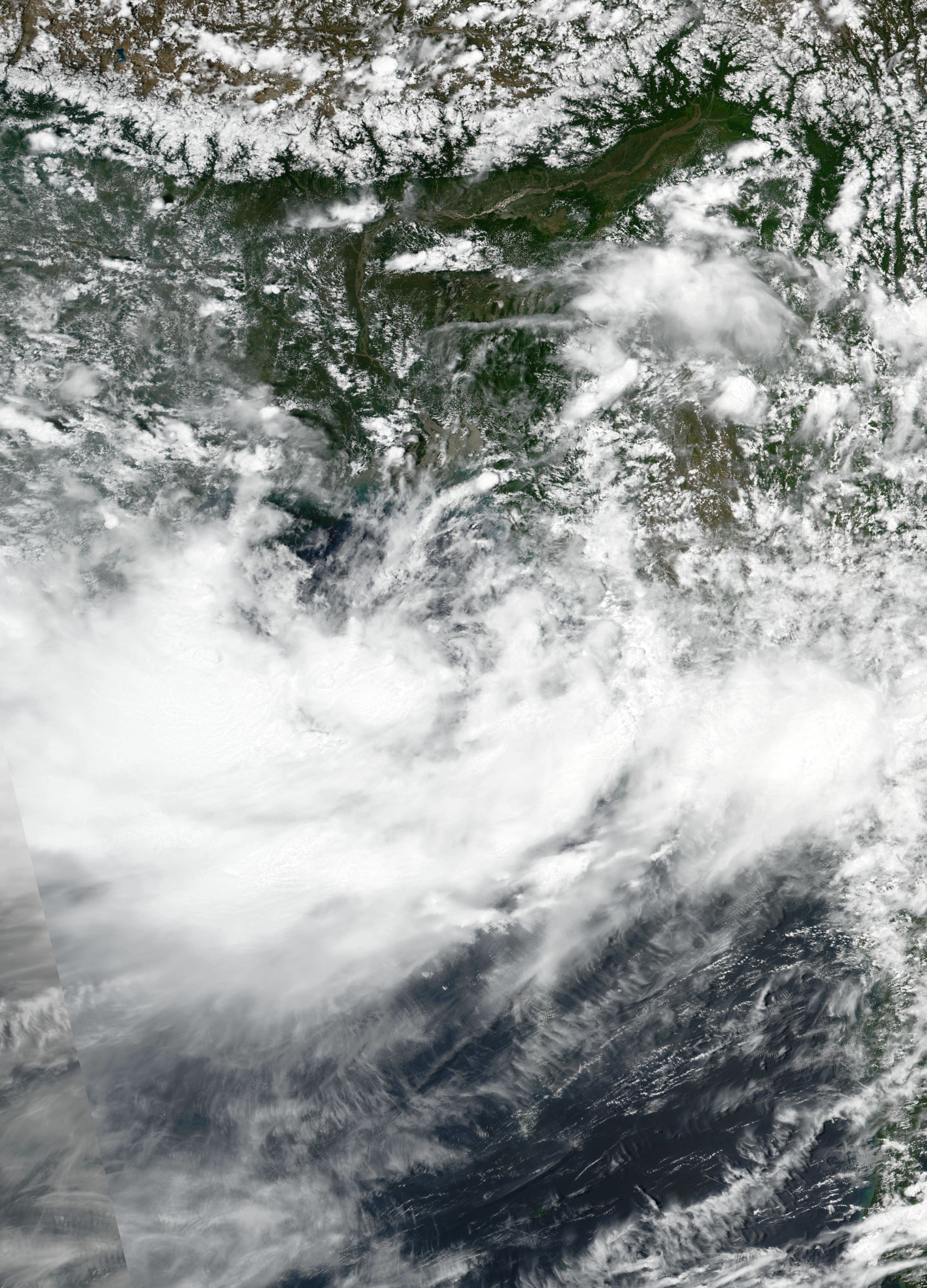
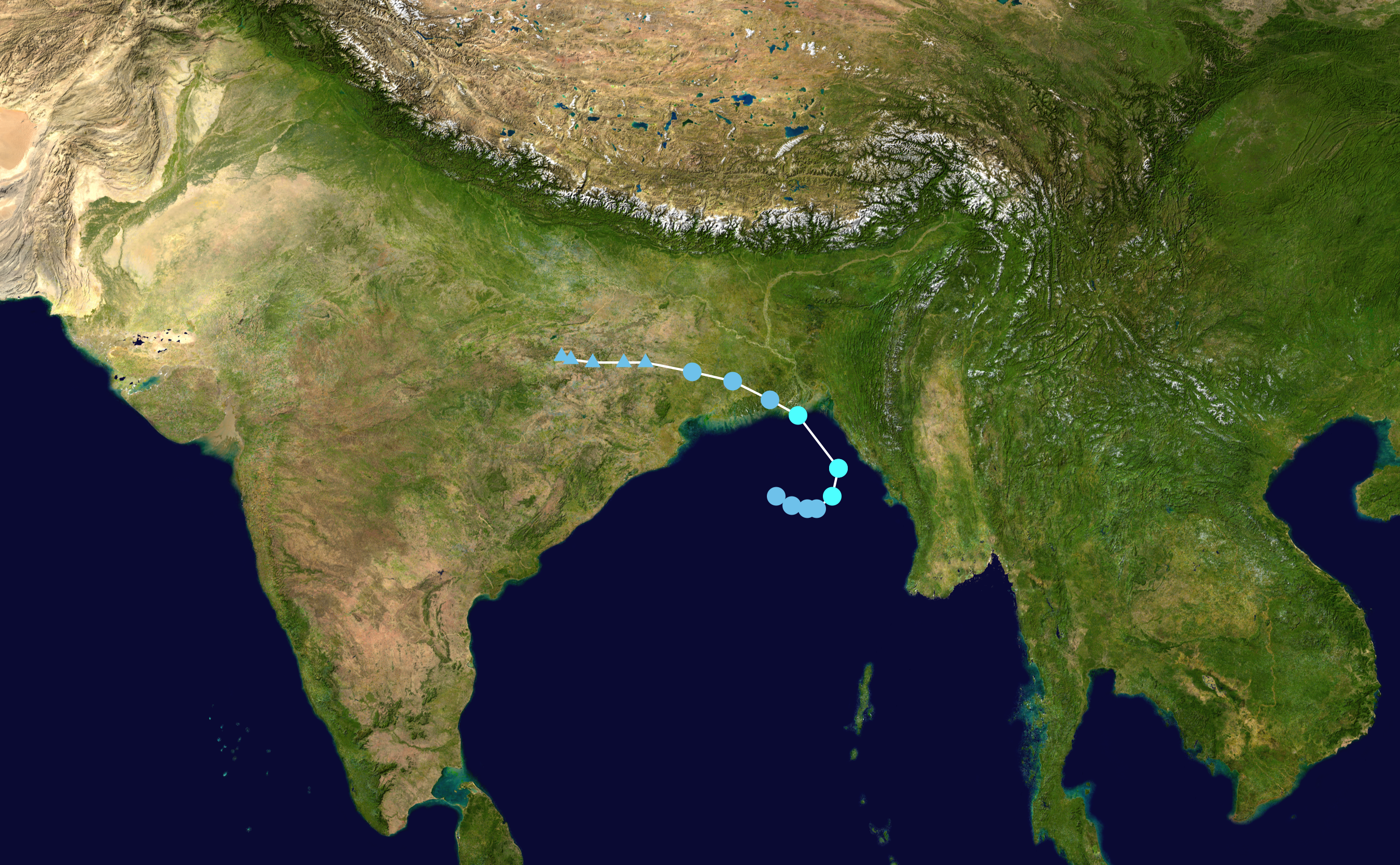
- Duration: 31 July – 3 August
- Peak intensity: 55 km/h (35 mph) (3-min); 988 hPa (mbar)

On 29 July the IMD noted a cyclonic circulation forming over North Odisha and nearby Gangetic West Bengal. On the same day, it noted the formation of low pressure area over same region and on next day it moved over the Northeastern part of Bay of Bengal. By the same time at 06:00 UTC on 31 July, the JTWC designated it as Invest 95B and gave low chance of developing. Despite its low level circulation exposed, it continued to intensify and at 12:00 UTC of the same day, the IMD upgraded it to a well marked low. On 21:00 UTC, the JTWC upgraded it to a tropical storm designated as 04B and peaked as a 40 kt storm. On 00:00 UTC of 1 August, the IMD upgraded it to a Depression designated as BOB 03. It continued to intensify till Deep Depression intensity off the coast of Bangladesh and made landfall at Khepupara in Bangladesh at 12:00 UTC. The JTWC stopped issuing advisories by 06:00 UTC stating that it made landfall. It continued to move into Eastern India while maintaining intensity. It weakened into Depression over Jharkhand on 2 August 18:00 UTC. Continued to move west-northwest, it became a well-marked low pressure area over north Chhattisgarh and nearby region by 12:00 UTC on 3 August.

=== Depression ARB 02 ===
- Depression (IMD)
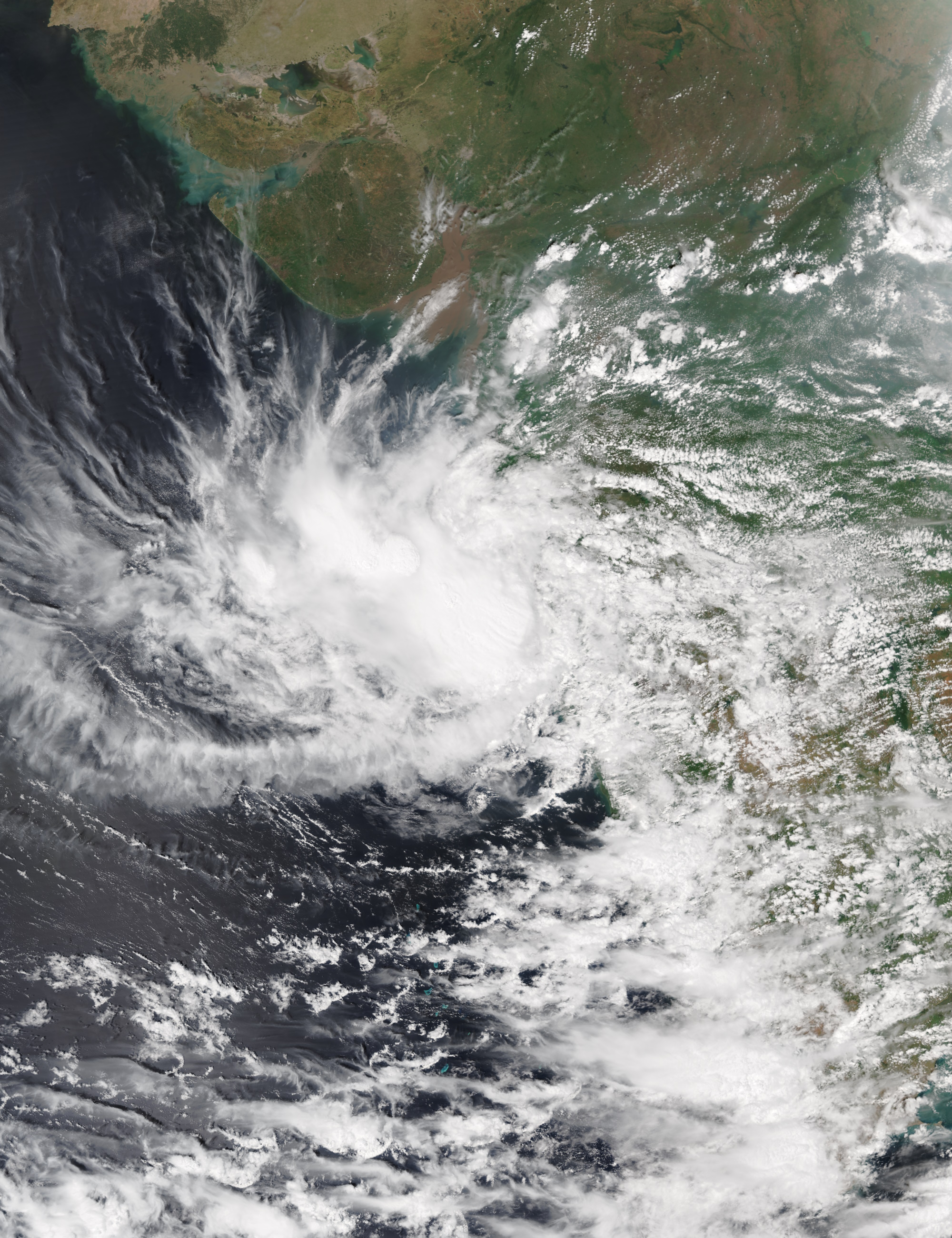
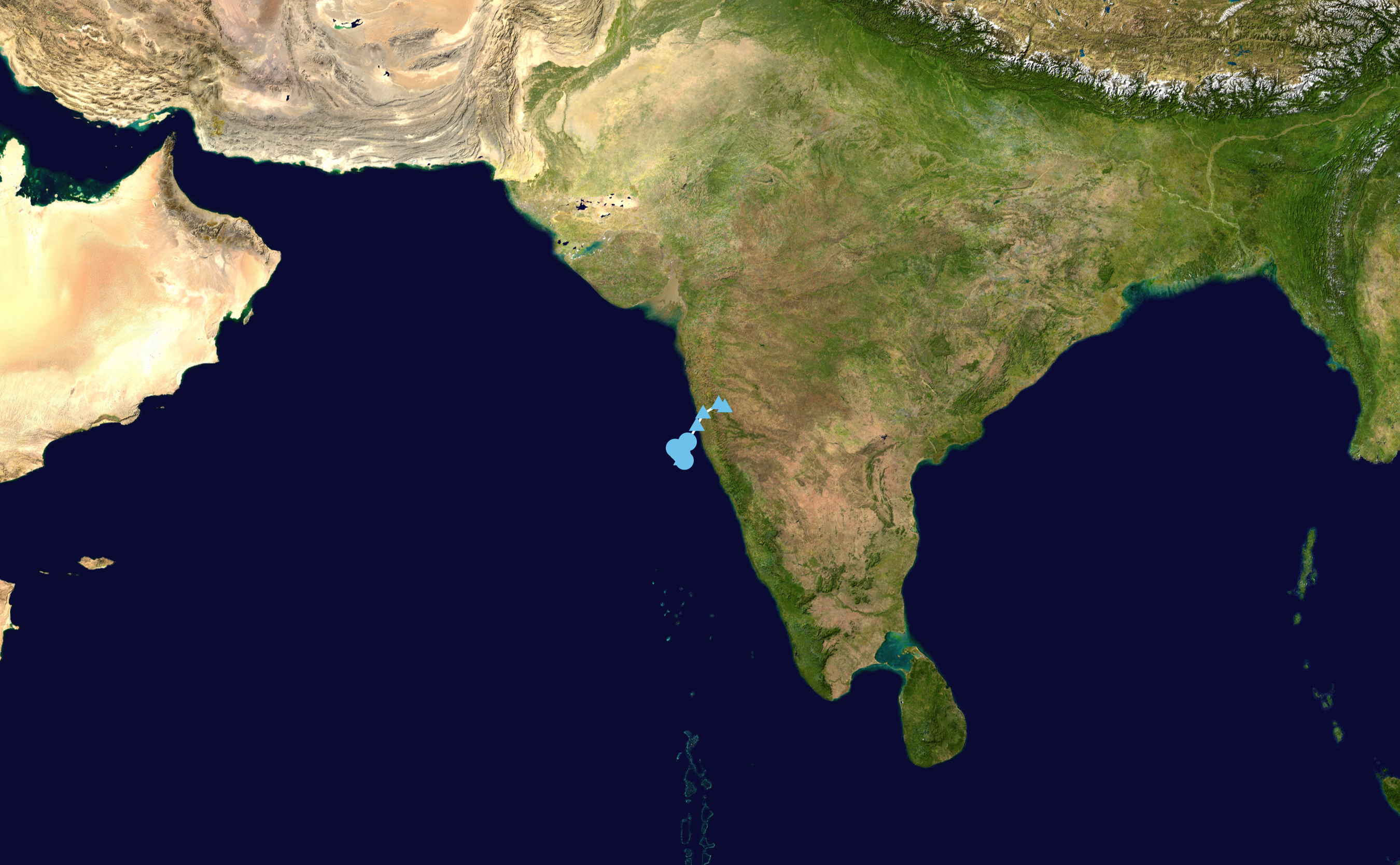
- Duration: 30 September – 1 October
- Peak intensity: 45 km/h (30 mph) (3-min); 1002 hPa (mbar)

In the early hours of 29 September, an area of low pressure spawned over the eastern Arabian Sea near the Konkan coast. Amidst favourable conditions, the low rapidly organized, becoming a well-marked low pressure area by 00:00 UTC the next day before developing into a depression three hours later. However, its proximity to land prevented the system from intensifying further as it moved northeastward, and it made landfall between Panjim and Ratnagiri between 15:00–17:00 UTC that same day. The depression moved east-northeastward following landfall, weakening to a well-marked low pressure area over southern Maharashtra by 03:00 UTC on 1 October.

The depression brought heavy rainfall over the states of Kerala, Karnataka, and Goa. No damages were reported from the system.

=== Extremely Severe Cyclonic Storm Tej ===
- Extremely severe cyclonic storm (IMD)
- Category 3 tropical cyclone (SSHWS)
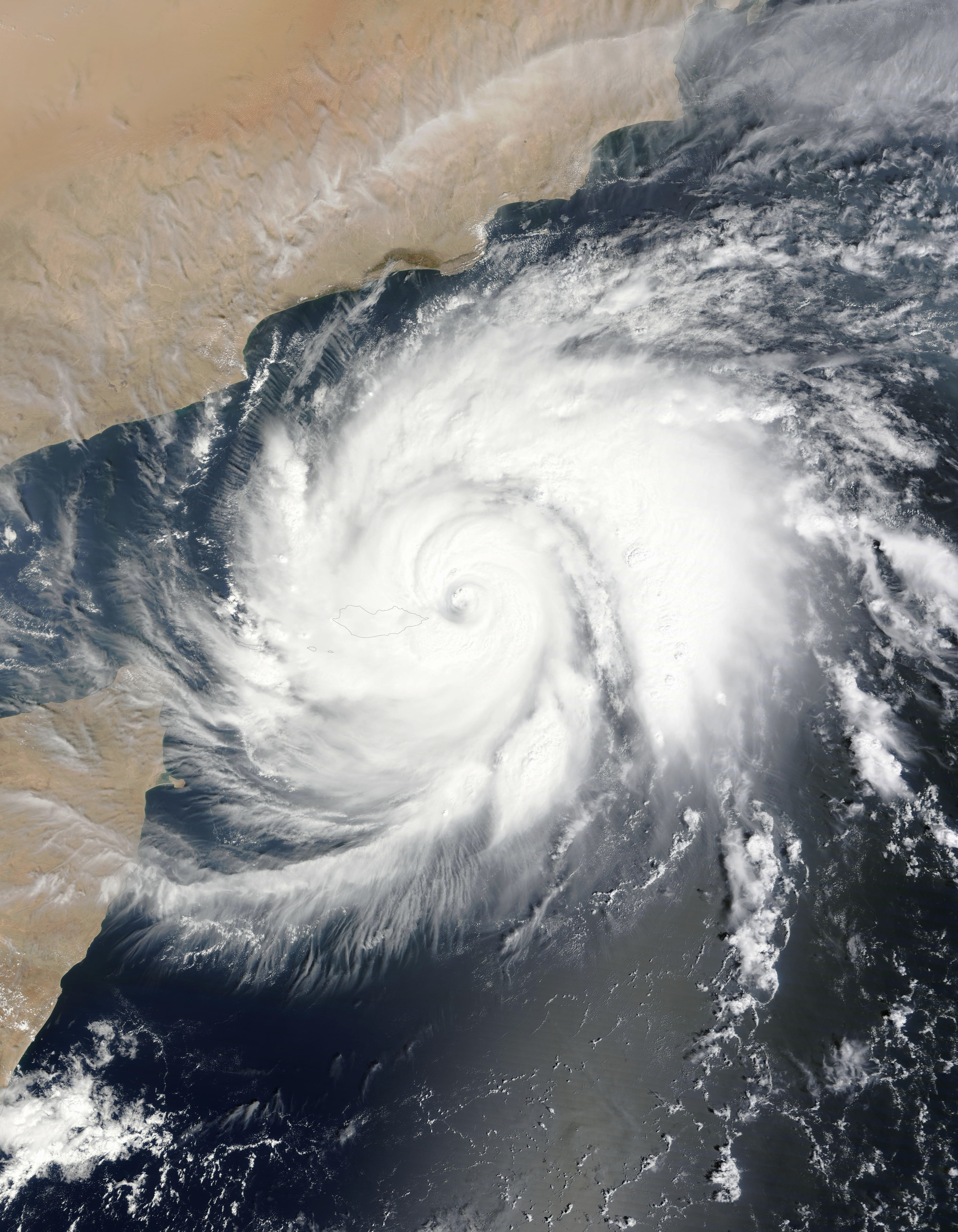
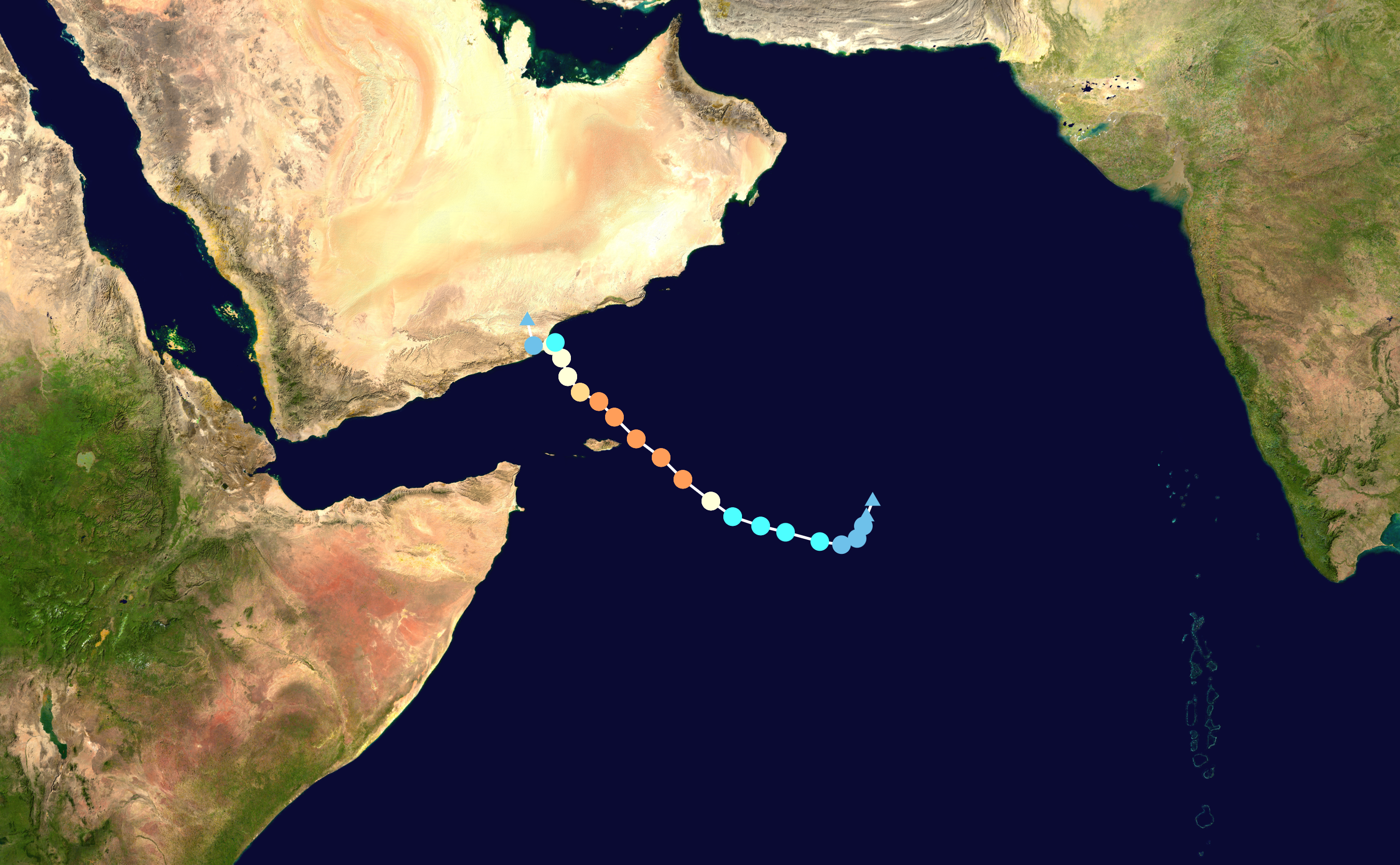
- Duration: 20 October – 24 October
- Peak intensity: 175 km/h (110 mph) (3-min); 964 hPa (mbar)

On 16 October, the India Meteorological Department (IMD) began monitoring a disturbance which had the potential to become a cyclonic circulation in the Arabian Sea. In the Arabian Sea, warmer sea surface temperatures, pointing to positive Indian Ocean Dipole, would help the disturbance develop. A cyclonic circulation formed over the Arabian Sea on 16 October, and a low-pressure area formed as a result of the cyclonic circulation in the morning of 18 October. The system would coalesce into a depression on 21 October. Later that day, the system would intensify into a cyclonic storm, receiving the name Tej. (Note: The name Tej (Hindi: तेज, [teːd͡ʒ]) was contributed by India and means "energy, vigor" in Hindi.) As Tej traversed northwestward, it would be in an environment with warm SSTs, allowing it to rapidly intensify into a Category-3 tropical cyclone on 22 October. The storm would soon weaken, making landfall in the Al Mahrah Governorate of Yemen between 23 and 24 October 2023, bringing significant rainfall and flooding across the eastern half of the country and western parts of Oman.

Torrential rain on Saturday caused flooding on the island of Socotra as the cyclone made landfall. The flooding led to some roads in the governorate's capital city of Hadibu being cut, along with other areas in the archipelago. The Socotra Airport recorded 13 mm (0.51 in) of rain, with wind speeds reaching 25 kn (45 km/h; 30 mph) and gusts exceeding 25 kn (45 km/h; 30 mph). Damages are estimated to be greater than US$1 million.

=== Very Severe Cyclonic Storm Hamoon ===
- Very severe cyclonic storm (IMD)
- Category 2 tropical cyclone (SSHWS)
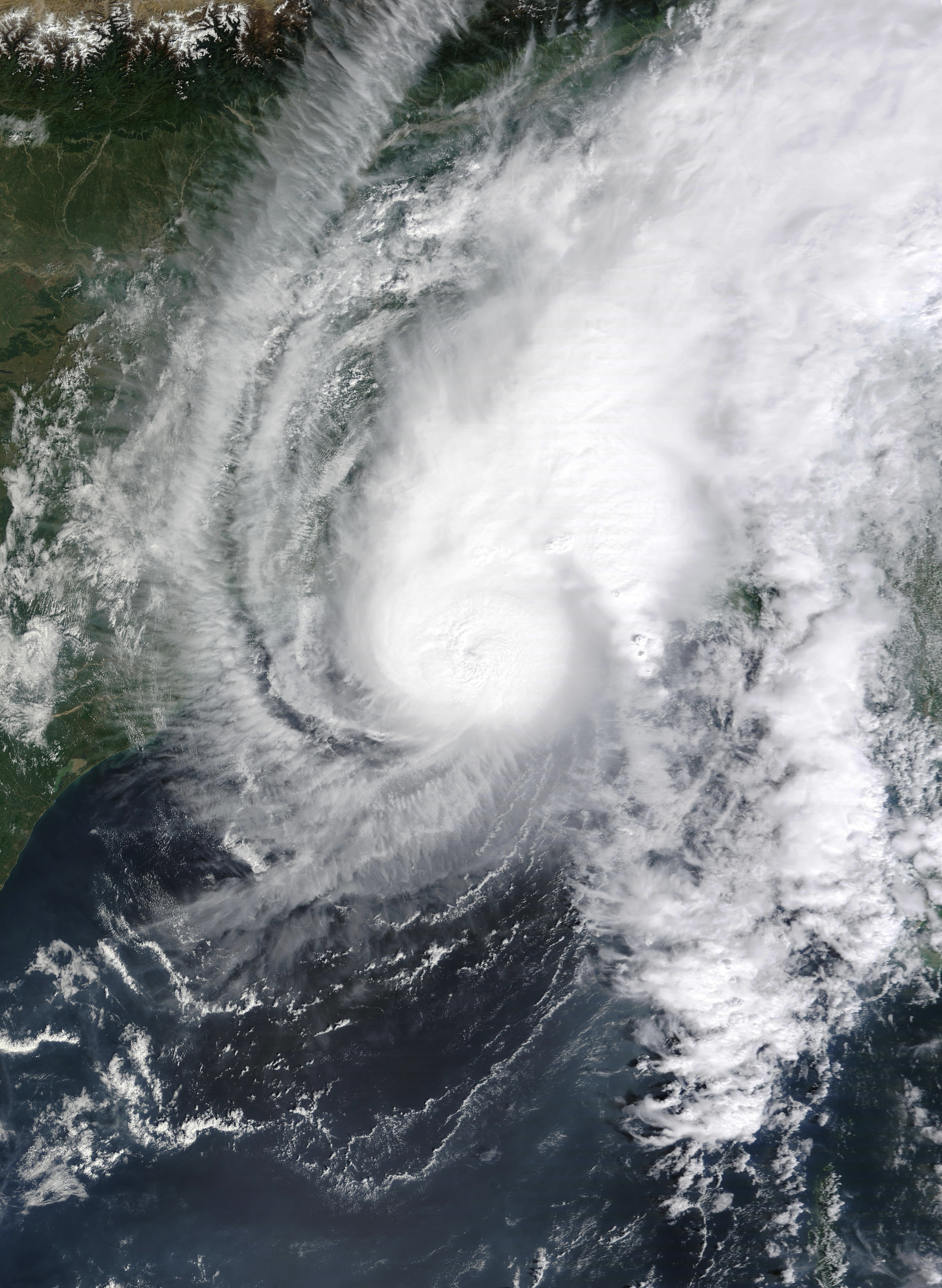
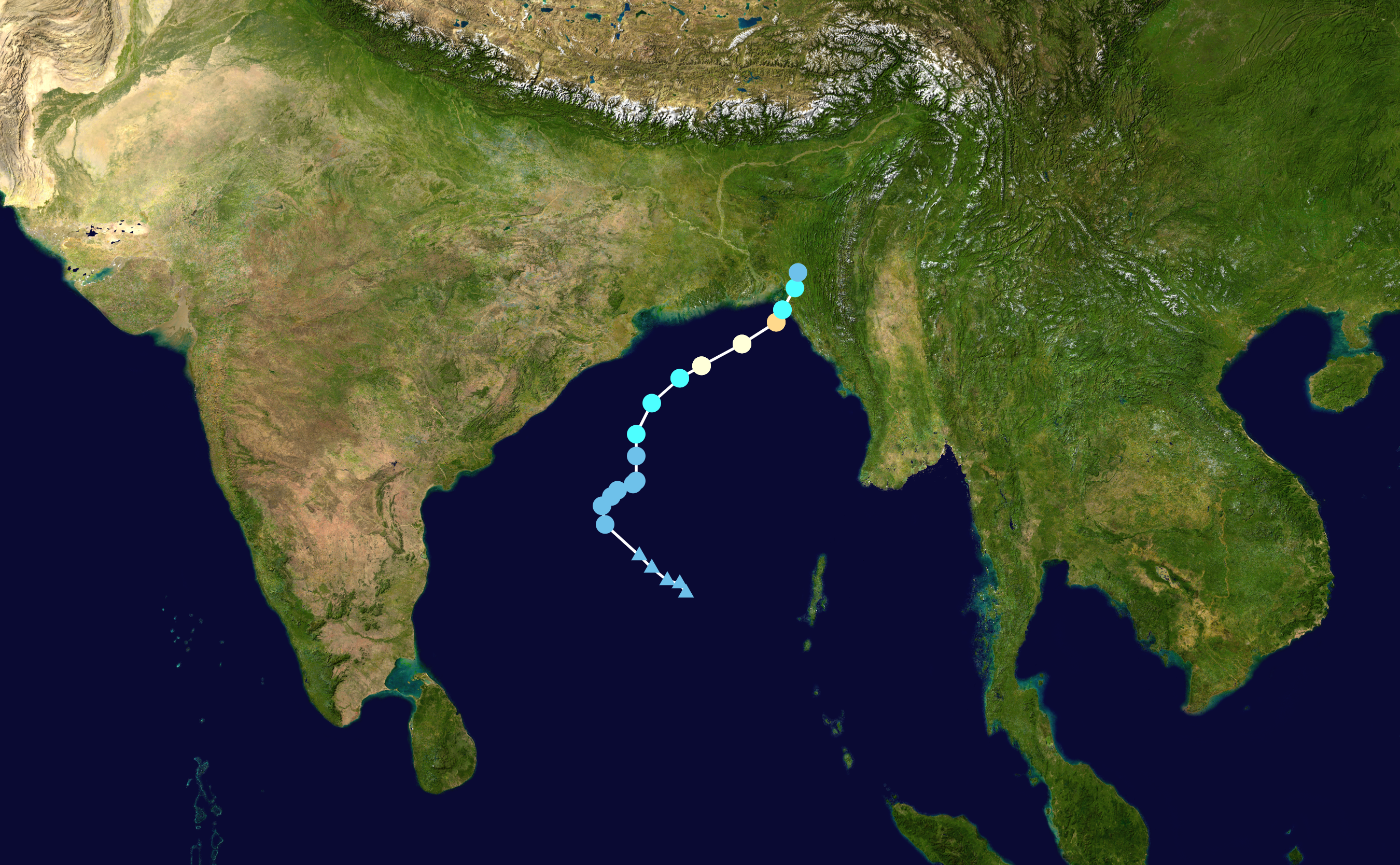
- Duration: 21 October – 25 October
- Peak intensity: 120 km/h (75 mph) (3-min); 984 hPa (mbar)

On 21 October, a low-pressure area formed in the Bay of Bengal. On the same day the Joint Typhoon Warning Center (JTWC) issued a Tropical Cyclone Formation Alert (TCFA) and classified the disturbance as Tropical Depression 06B. Due to its favorable conditions, 06B intensified into a cyclonic storm, which was given the name Hamoon by the IMD. (Note: The name Hamoon (Persian: هامون, [hæːˈmuːn]) was contributed by Iran and refers to Hamoun Oasis in Persian.) On 24 October, Hamoon intensified into a category 2-equivalent cyclone, reaching its peak intensity with sustained winds of 120 km/h (75 mph) and gusts of 140 km/h (85 mph). The storm made landfall on Cox's Bazar on the Bangladesh coast, bringing strong winds and intense rainfall into that area. Hamoon dissipated over Myanmar on 25 October as it moved inland.

As the system lashed the country, five people were killed in total as Hamoon crossed the Cox's Bazar and Chittagong coasts. Hundreds were left homeless as their homes were severely damaged, while trees were uprooted, and electric poles are down. A yellow warning was issued for six districts in the state.

=== Severe Cyclonic Storm Midhili ===
- Severe cyclonic storm (IMD)
- Tropical storm (SSHWS)
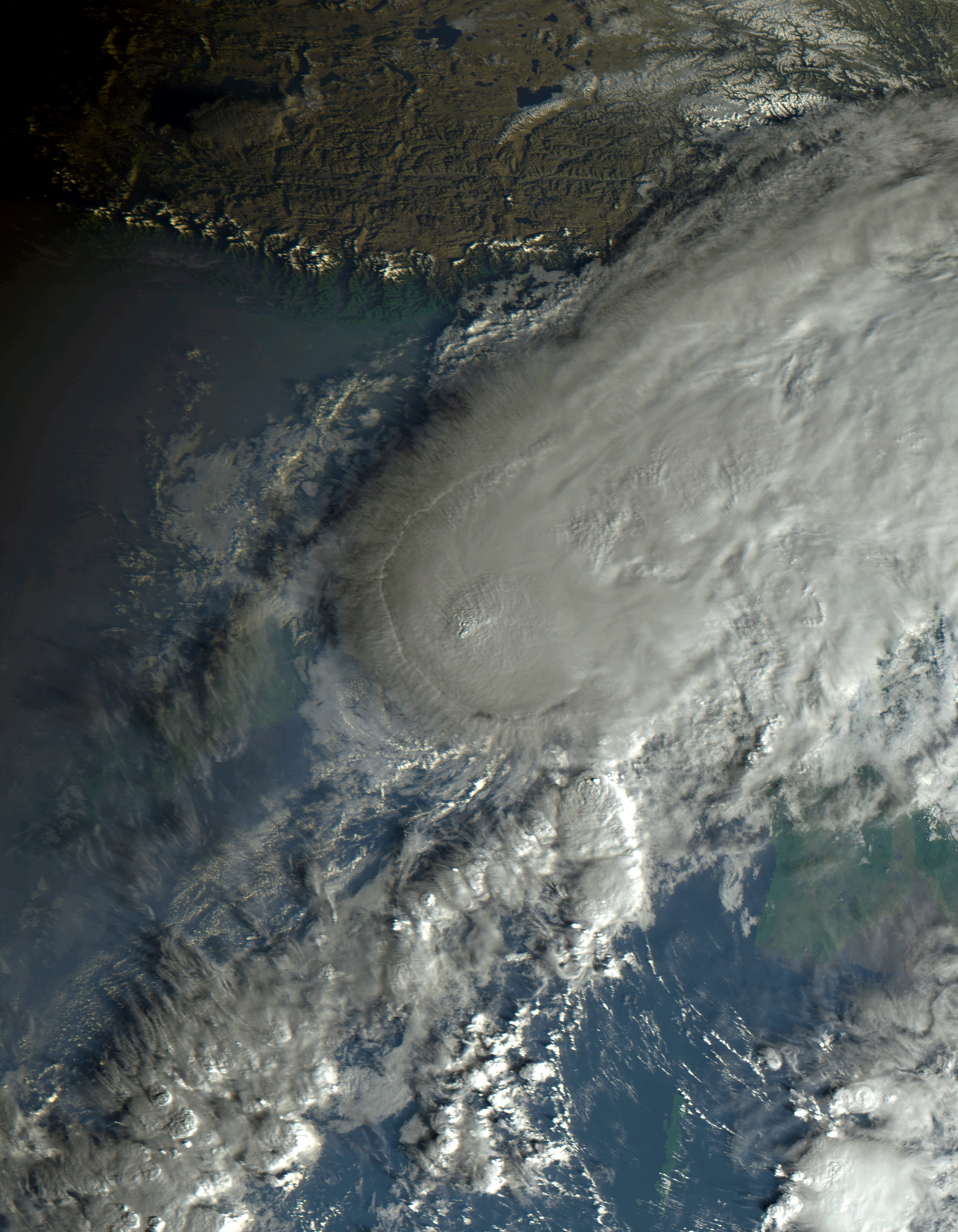
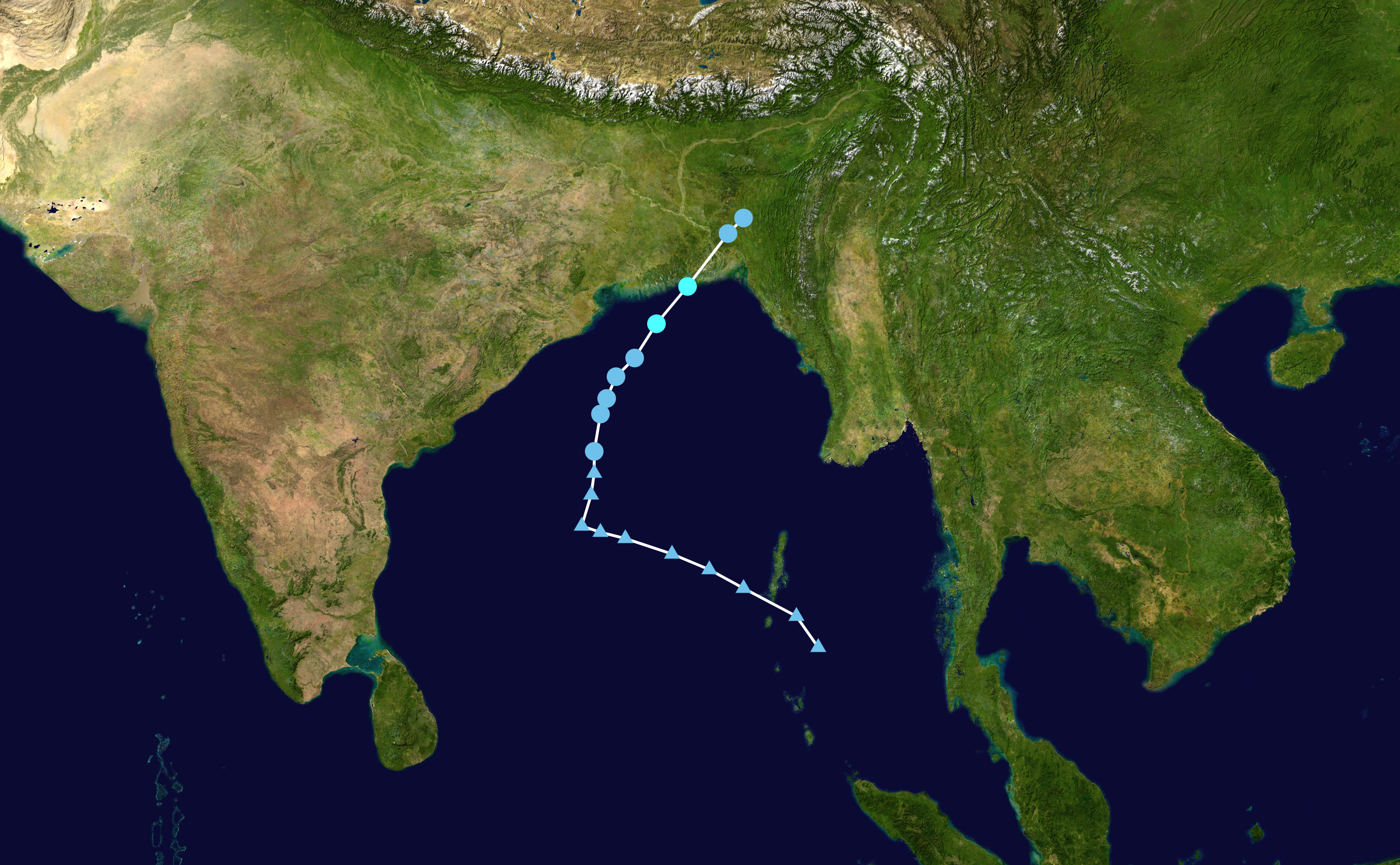
- Duration: 15 November – 18 November
- Peak intensity: 95 km/h (60 mph) (3-min); 996 hPa (mbar)

A low-pressure area formed over the Bay of Bengal on 14 November. The system would later cross into favorable conditions for any intensification. In this case, the system gradually intensified and on 15 November, the India Meteorological Department (IMD) designated it as a low pressure. The next day, the low pressure intensified into a deep depression. JTWC later followed suit and designated the depression as Tropical Cyclone 07B. On 17 November, the IMD named the system Midhili. (Note: The name Midhili (Dhivehi: މިދިލި, [mid̪ili]) was contributed by the Maldives and refers to the tropical almond (Terminalia catappa) in Dhivehi.) Midhili made landfall in central Bangladesh on the same day as a minimal cyclonic storm. As it moved inland, Midhili rapidly weakened before its dissipation on 18 November.

On 17 November 2023, Port of Payra and Port of Mongla of Bangladesh were asked to show danger signal number 7 and Port of Chittagong and Cox's Bazar to show danger signal number 6. Department of Meteorology. The Bangladesh Inland Water Transport Authority (BIWTA) announced the suspension of all types of shipping due to Cyclone Midhili. In Teknaf Upazila of Cox's Bazar district of Bangladesh, rain started on the morning of Thursday, 16 November 2023, due to the effect of a deep depression created in the Bay of Bengal. After 8 pm, the intensity of the rain increased. The mud wall of a family living at the foot of the hill in the Panirchhara area of Morichyaghona collapsed. Four members of the family were killed. An old man in the Magadhara union of Sandwip upazila was killed when a tree fell over him, while a child was killed in a separate incident due to a falling tree branch. A businessperson died in Basail Upazila, also due to a fallen tree.

=== Severe Cyclonic Storm Michaung ===
- Severe cyclonic storm (IMD)
- Category 1 tropical cyclone (SSHWS)
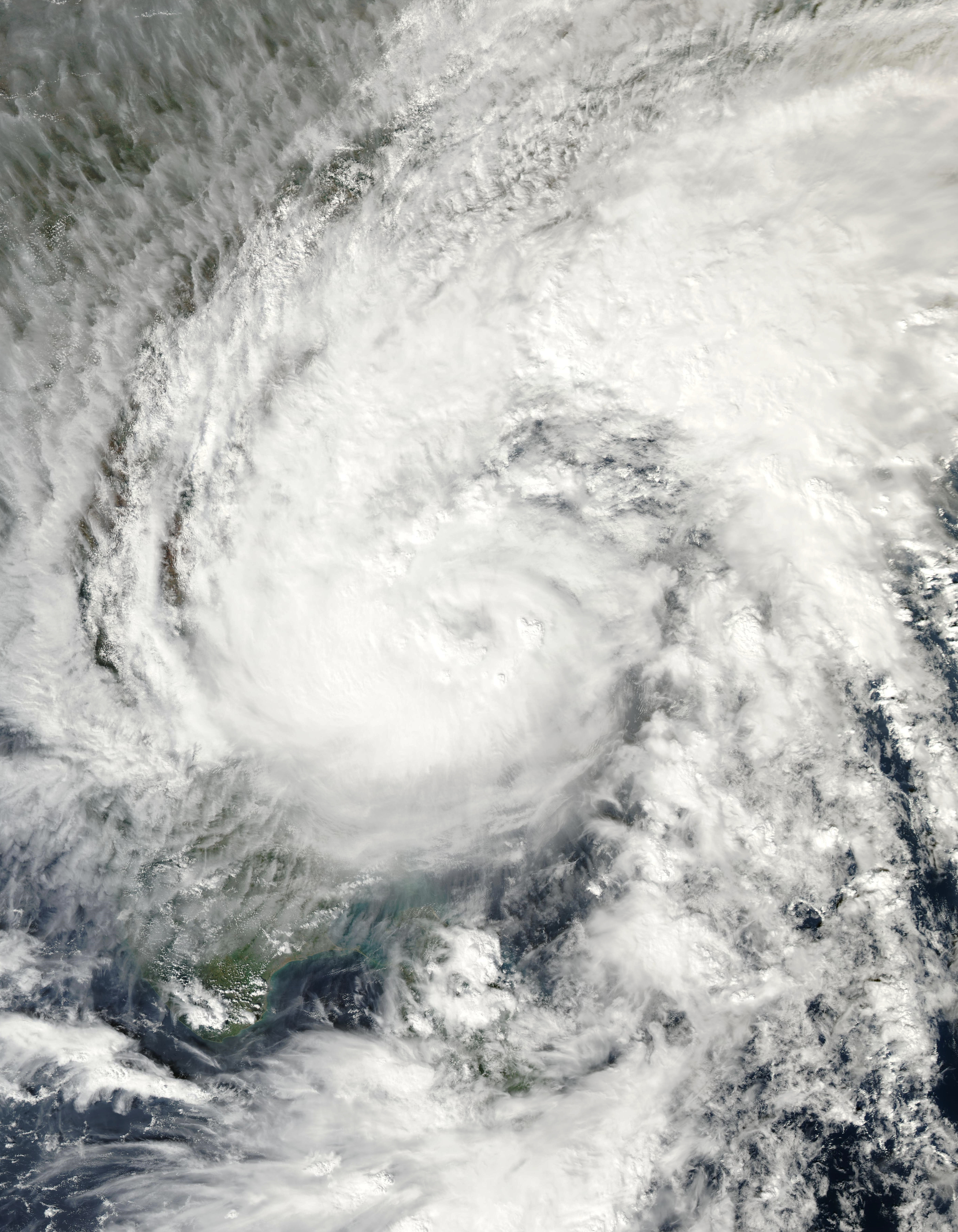
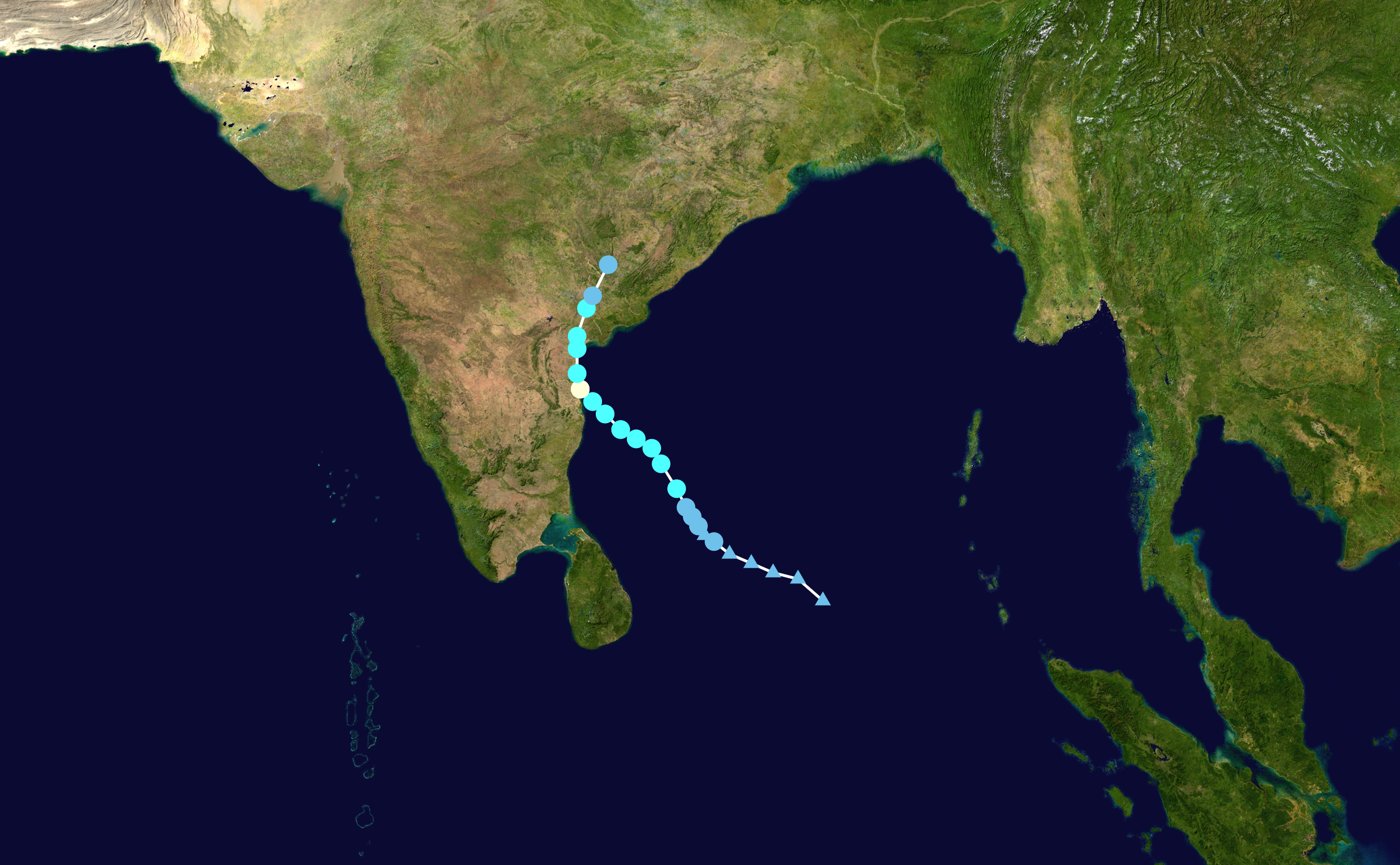
- Duration: 1 December – 6 December
- Peak intensity: 100 km/h (65 mph) (3-min); 986 hPa (mbar)

In late November, a low-pressure area crossed into the Bay of Bengal from the Gulf of Thailand. On 1 December, the IMD said that a depression that had formed in the South Andaman Sea. It was expected to move towards the northwest and strengthen in the Bay of Bengal. On 2 December 2023, the system intensified into a deep depression when it was located about 440 km east-southeast of Puducherry. Shortly after that, it intensified into a cyclonic storm, and was assigned the name Michaung. (Note: The name Michaung (Burmese: မိကျောင်း, [mḭ.d͡ʑáʊɴ]) was contributed by Myanmar and means "crocodile" in Burmese.) As the storm approached the coast, heavy rain and strong winds battered the affected areas. Chennai, the capital of Tamil Nadu, experienced the worst rains in over 100 years, causing widespread flooding and disrupting daily life. More than 9,000 people were evacuated from low-lying coastal areas as a precautionary measure. According to the IMD, it moved almost directly northwards along the coastline, and on 5 December, the storm made landfall between Nellore and Machilipatnam in Andhra Pradesh, bringing heavy rains, fierce winds and storm surges, inundating coastal villages. Cyclone Michaung weakened as it moved inland, gradually losing strength.

The storm's impact was particularly severe in Nellore, Prakasam and Guntur districts, where severe damage to agriculture and infrastructure was reported.

=== Other system ===
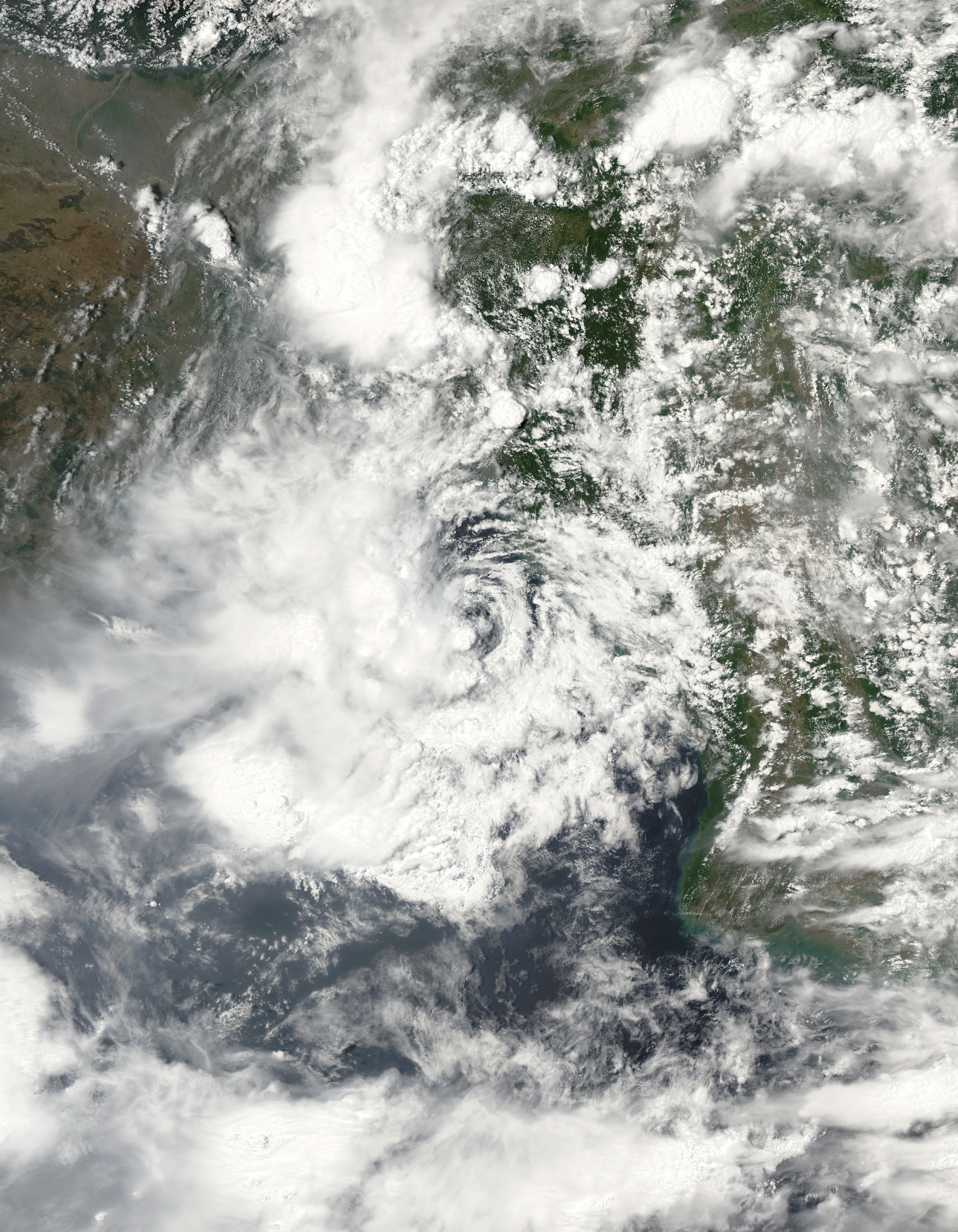
A tropical cyclone off the coast of Bangladesh in 9 June

Under the influence of another cyclonic circulation, a low-pressure area formed over the northeast Bay of Bengal on 9 June, coalescing into a well-marked low-pressure area later that day. Simultaneously, the JTWC would report that the system became Tropical Cyclone 03B after its low-level circulation center became fully exposed within its disorganized convection. The system would weaken, becoming a low-pressure area over Bangladesh the next day, resulting in the IMD issuing their last advisory. The JTWC would issue its last bulletin on the system on 03:00 UTC on 10 June.

== Storm names ==
Within this basin, a tropical cyclone is assigned a name when it is judged to have reached cyclonic storm intensity with winds of 65 kilometres per hour (40 mph). The names were selected by a new list from the Regional Specialized Meteorological Center in New Delhi by mid year of 2020. There is no retirement of tropical cyclone names in this basin as the list of names is only scheduled to be used once before a new list of names is drawn up. Should a named tropical cyclone move into the basin from the Western Pacific, then it will retain its original name. The names which were used for the 2023 season are listed below.

- Mocha
- Biparjoy
- Tej
- Hamoon
- Midhili
- Michaung

== Season effects ==
This is a table of all storms in the 2023 North Indian Ocean cyclone season. It mentions all of the season's storms and their names, duration, peak intensities according to the IMD storm scale, damage, and death totals. Damage and death totals include the damage and deaths caused when that storm was a precursor wave or extratropical low. All of the damage figures are in 2023 USD.

Name	Dates	Peak intensity			Areas affected	Damage (USD)	Deaths	Ref(s).
Name	Dates	Category	Wind speed	Pressure	Areas affected	Damage (USD)	Deaths	Ref(s).
BOB 01	30 January – 2 February	Depression	45 km/h (30 mph)	1004 hPa (29.65 inHg)	Sri Lanka	—N/a	0	
Mocha	9–15 May	Extremely severe cyclonic storm	215 km/h (130 mph)	938 hPa (27.70 inHg)	Andaman and Nicobar Islands, Sri Lanka, Myanmar, Bangladesh, India, China	$2.24 billion	463	
Biparjoy	6–19 June	Extremely severe cyclonic storm	165 km/h (105 mph)	958 hPa (28.29 inHg)	India, Pakistan	$148 million	17	
BOB 03	31 July – 3 August	Deep depression	55 km/h (35 mph)	988 hPa (29.18 inHg)	Myanmar, Bangladesh, West Bengal, Jharkhand, Odisha, Bihar, Chhattisgarh	—N/a	0	
ARB 02	30 September – 1 October	Depression	45 km/h (30 mph)	1000 hPa (29.53 inHg)	Goa, Maharashtra, Karnataka	—N/a	0	
Tej	20–24 October	Extremely severe cyclonic storm	175 km/h (110 mph)	964 hPa (28.47 inHg)	Socotra, Yemen, Oman	$1 million	2	
Hamoon	21–25 October	Very severe cyclonic storm	120 km/h (75 mph)	984 hPa (29.06 inHg)	Bangladesh, West Bengal, Mizoram	$250 million	5	
Midhili	15–18 November	Severe cyclonic storm	95 km/h (60 mph)	996 hPa (29.41 inHg)	Northeast India, Bangladesh, West Bengal	$109 million	10	
Michaung	1–6 December	Severe cyclonic storm	100 km/h (65 mph)	986 hPa (29.12 inHg)	Tamil Nadu, Andhra Pradesh, Odisha, West Bengal, Bangladesh	$1.32 billion	17	
Season aggregates
9 systems	30 January – 6 December		215 km/h (130 mph)	938 hPa (27.70 inHg)		$4.07 billion	514	

== See also ==
- Weather of 2023
- Tropical cyclones in 2023
- North Indian Ocean cyclone season
- 2023 Atlantic hurricane season
- 2023 Pacific hurricane season
- 2023 Pacific typhoon season
- South-West Indian Ocean cyclone seasons: 2022–23, 2023–24
- Australian region cyclone seasons: 2022–23, 2023–24
- South Pacific cyclone seasons: 2022–23, 2023–24
