= Cyclone Hamoon =

North Indian Ocean cyclone in 2023

Very Severe Cyclonic Storm Hamoon
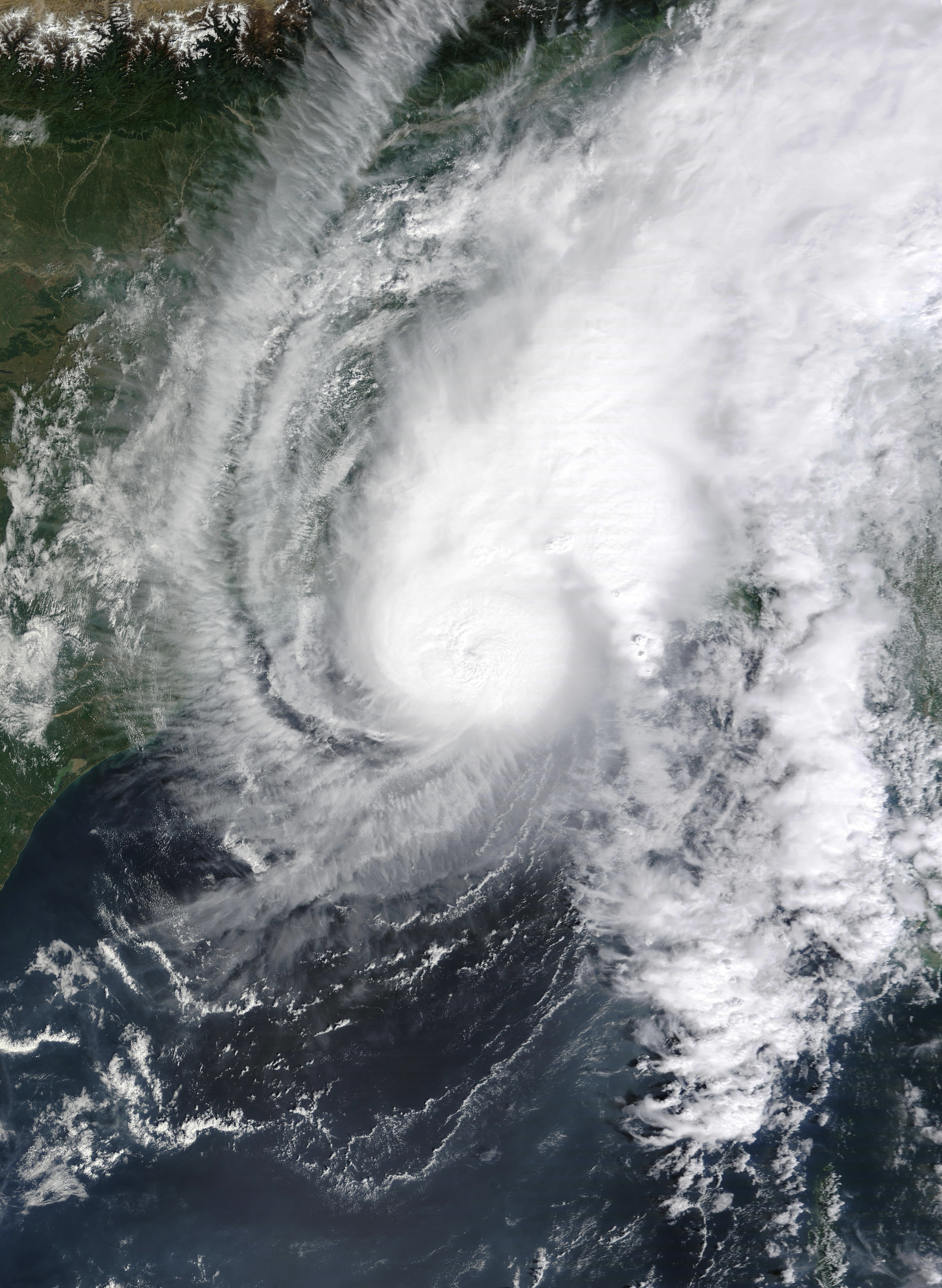
- Hamoon near peak intensity while approaching Bangladesh on 24 October

Meteorological history
- Formed: 21 October 2023
- Dissipated: 25 October 2023

Very severe cyclonic storm
- 3-minute sustained (IMD)
- Highest winds: 120 km/h (75 mph)
- Lowest pressure: 984 hPa (mbar); 29.06 inHg

Category 2-equivalent tropical cyclone
- 1-minute sustained (SSHWS/JTWC)
- Highest winds: 165 km/h (105 mph)
- Lowest pressure: 970 hPa (mbar); 28.64 inHg

Overall effects
- Fatalities: 5
- Injuries: 63
- Damage: $250 million (2023 USD)
- Areas affected: Bangladesh, Myanmar, Northeast India
- Part of the 2023 North Indian Ocean cyclone season

Very Severe Cyclonic Storm Hamoon (Note: The name Hamoon (Persian: هامون, [hæːˈmuːn]) was contributed by Iran and refers to Hamoun Oasis in Persian.) was a moderately strong tropical cyclone that affected Bangladesh, India, and Myammar during October 2023. The fourth named storm of the 2023 North Indian Ocean cyclone season, Hamoon formed from a low-pressure area over the west-central Bay of Bengal on 21 October. Initially slowly developing, after it entered an area favorable for development, it rapidly intensified, peaking as a very severe cyclonic storm on 24 October. However, soon after, Hamoon weakened due to wind shear, later making landfall in Bangladesh as a severe cyclonic storm. Once inland, Hamoon degenerated into a low-pressure area, last being noted on 26 October.

Prior to Hamoon's landfall, officials in Bangladesh ordered the evacuation of over 1.5 million people as it was expected to have a severe impact on the nation. Five people died and 63 others sustained injuries as Hamoon made its devastating landfall in Bangladesh on 26 October. Over 6 million people lost power, primarily in the port of Cox's Bazar, where several days after Hamoon made landfall, over 5 million were still without power. Elsewhere, a weakening Hamoon mainly brought light rainfall to India and Myanmar. In total, according to Aon, the cyclone caused around $250 million in damage.

== Meteorological history ==
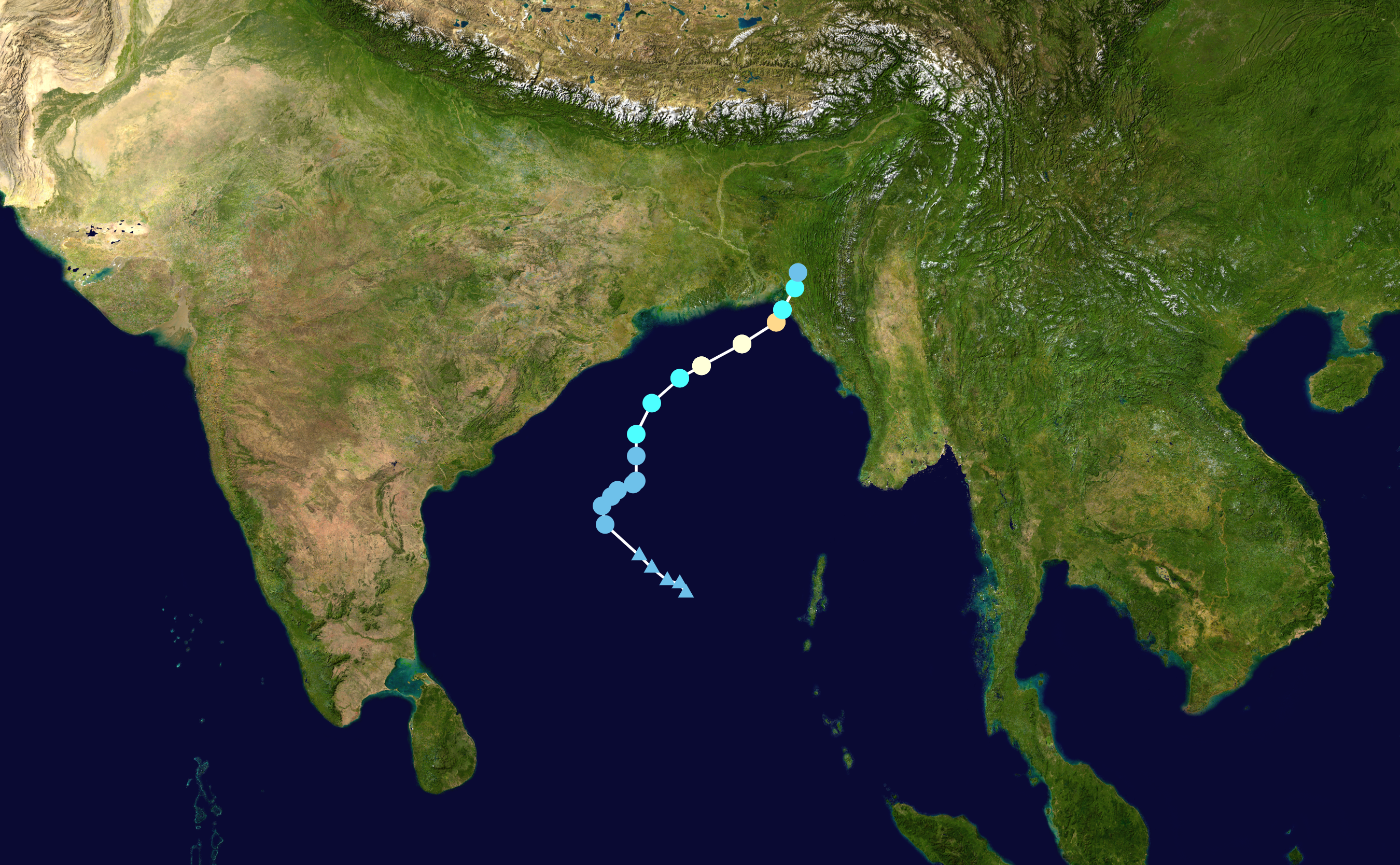
Map plotting the storm's track and intensity, according to the Saffir–Simpson scale Map key Saffir–Simpson scale Tropical depression (≤38 mph, ≤62 km/h) Tropical storm (39–73 mph, 63–118 km/h) Category 1 (74–95 mph, 119–153 km/h) Category 2 (96–110 mph, 154–177 km/h) Category 3 (111–129 mph, 178–208 km/h) Category 4 (130–156 mph, 209–251 km/h) Category 5 (≥157 mph, ≥252 km/h) Unknown Storm type Tropical cyclone Subtropical cyclone Extratropical cyclone, remnant low, tropical disturbance, or monsoon depression

On 12 October, in their extended range outlook, the India Meteorological Department (IMD) noted that in a few days, tropical cyclonegenesis was likely to occur in the Bay of Bengal. Several days later, on 17 October, they began monitoring a cyclonic circulation over the southeastern Bay of Bengal. Developing, on 20 October, a low-pressure area formed from this circulation over the southcentral Bay of Bengal. A few hours later, the Joint Typhoon Warning Center (JTWC) began tracking the system, noting that the low-level circulation was in an favorable environment for development, with low 5–10 mph (10–20 km/h) vertical wind shear and warm sea surface temperatures (SSTs) of 29–30 °C (84–86 °F), only offset by the disturbance's poor outflow. As a result, early the next day, the disturbance developed into a well-marked low-pressure area. Consolidating as it generated good outflow aloft, by the night of 21 October, the low-pressure area had become a depression.

Infrared imagery of Hamoon rapidly intensifying off the coast of Bangladesh late on 23 October.

Initially tracking north-northwestward, after it recurved northwestward the next day, the depression developed further, becoming a deep depression at 12:00 UTC that day. Around six hours later, the JTWC issued a TCFA on the deep depression, noting that it had developed convective banding across all quadrants and good poleward outflow. As a result, the JTWC recognized the system as Tropical Cyclone 06B around that time, prior to it intensifying into a cyclonic storm and being named Hamoon by the IMD. Early the next day, the depression would encounter an environment with high SSTS of 29–30 °C (84–86 °F), low to moderate vertical wind shear, strong low-level vorticity, and convergence in the vicinity of the cyclone alongside strong upper-level divergence above the system, causing the system to undergo rapid intensification.

Intensifying into a severe cyclonic storm early on 24 October, Hamoon soon further developed, becoming a very severe cyclonic storm just a few hours later, peaking with 3-minute sustained winds of 75 mph (120 km/h) around that time. A few hours later, Hamoon would peak with 1-minute sustained winds of 100 mph (155 km/h), making it a Category 2-equivalent hurricane on the Saffir–Simpson scale. However, as it tracked northeastwards due to a trough embedded in the westerlies, it crossed into a region of high wind shear, weakening into a severe cyclonic storm a few hours later. Later that day, Hamoon made landfall south of Chittagong, Bangladesh as a severe tropical storm, prompting the JTWC to stop tracking it. Weakening rapidly once inland, on 12:00 UTC on 25 October, Hamoon degenerated into a well-marked low. These remnants further weakened, last being monitored as a low-pressure area over northeastern India the next day.

== Preparations ==
=== Bangladesh ===
On 24 October, the Bangladesh Meteorological Department (BMD) issued Danger Signal No. 7 for the coastal districts of Barisal, Patuakhali, Bhola, Borguna, Pirojpur, Jhalokathi, Chittagong, Feni, Noakhali, Lakshmipur, and Chandpur, while advising the maritime ports of Payra and Chittagong to hoist Danger Signal No. 7 as well. Elsewhere, the maritime port of Cox's Bazar was advised to hoist Danger Signal No. 6, while the port of Mongla was advised to hoist Danger Signal No. 5. Meanwhile, the Bangladesh Inland Water Transport Authority (BIWTA) halted all river traffic in the nation. The Chittagong Port Authority dispatched eighty-eight ships to the deep sea in order to safeguard against potential damages from Cyclone Hamoon.

The government implemented measures to evacuate 1.5 million people from vulnerable areas, relocating them to government shelters across ten coastal districts in preparation for Cyclone Hamoon. In St. Martin's Island, over fifteen hundred tourists were ordered to leave due to adverse weather conditions caused by Hamoon, being sent back to nearby Teknaf using three ships. However, over 250 of these tourists disobeyed these orders. Elsewhere, around 576 shelters in nine upazilas of Cox's Bazar District were activated. In Barisal District, 541 cyclone response centers were established, alongside sixty-one medical teams and 322 tonnes of rice. Elsewhere, in Lakshmipur District, 285 shelters were arranged by the district's administration. Ships on the Lakshmipur-Bhola-Barishal route and ferries on the Lakshmipur-Bhola route were suspended. In Chittagong District, 803 shelters were opened, as around eighty-eight hundred volunteers and 290 medical teams being readied. By 24 October, over five hundred people were staying in shelters.

=== Elsewhere ===
As Hamoon developed into a deep depression on 23 October, the IMD issued a yellow warning in Odisha, for the districts of Bhadrak, Kendrapara, and Jagatsinghpur. This was later expanded to include coastal districts in West Bengal. Early the next day, they issued a rainfall alert for Odisha, West Bengal, Manipur, Tripura, Mizoram, Assam, and Meghalaya. Additionally, fishermen planning to venture in and offshore Odisha, West Bengal, Bangladesh, and the northern coast of Myanmar were discouraged by the IMD. In Pamban Island, a storm warning was issued to prevent fishers from leaving there. All signals were lowered by 26 October. Finally, in Myanmar, authorities in Rakhine State were issued an alert by the Department of Meteorology and Hydrology (DMH), being on standby and conducting preparedness tests.

== Impact ==
=== Bangladesh ===
In Cox's Bazar District, thousands of trees were uprooted while houses built with corrugated sheets were destroyed by Hamoon's winds. In the district's Rohingya refugee camps, hundreds of tarpaulin-covered bamboo shanties suffered damage. Almost 470,000 people were affected as Hamoon made landfall, with 2,500 of them being Rohingya refugees. Eight hundred of the refugees were temporarily displaced. Most of the learning centres run by Agrajattra sustained significant damage. Elsewhere in the district, five hundred people were displaced. In total, three people were killed while sixty-three people were injured in the district.

As Hamoon made landfall, gusts from the cyclone disrupted the power supply to the city of Cox's Bazar, causing blackouts. A peak gust of 148 km/h (92 mph) was recorded in the city at 8:12pm local time, causing many houses and rice paddy fields to be levelled by intense winds. Around 6 million lost power due to Hamoon. Cox's Bazar recorded 71 mm (2.8 in) of rainfall. In Chittagong District, one person died when they were crushed by a falling tree while another died when a building collapsed. Teknaf recorded 87 mm (3.4 in) of rainfall in a day while the city of Chittagong recorded 59 mm (2.3 in) in a day. In Cox's Bazar district, 354 electricity poles were uprooted, twenty-three transformers were damaged, and 496 electric wires were snapped. Collapsing trees caused the power supply to snap in over eight hundred places as they collapsed on electric wires. In total, according to Aon, Hamoon caused around $250 million in damages.

=== Elsewhere ===
In India, due to Hamoon, the onset of the northeast monsoon would be delayed, causing India to, at the time, have a yearly rainfall deficit of 11%. Portions of Odisha received light to moderate rainfall, with a peak of 52 mm (2.0 in) recorded in Paradeep. Due to Hamoon's winds, air pollutants would be dispersed towards Chennai, causing the city to have a "moderate" air quality index. The remnants of Hamoon later tracked into Myammar, producing heavy rain which peaked with 3.94 in (100 mm) in Thilin City and 2.95 in (75 mm) in Yangon. In Thantlang Township, ten houses in the Bong Kwar IDP Camp suffered damage.
