= Climate of Russia =

Köppen climate types of Russia

The climate of Russia is formed under the influence of several determining factors. The enormous size of the country and the remoteness of many areas from the sea result in the dominance of the continental climate, which is prevalent in European and Asian Russia except for the tundra and the extreme southwest. Mountains in the south obstructing the flow of warm air masses from the Indian Ocean and the plain of the west and north makes the country open to Arctic and Atlantic influences. Russia's climate, despite its enormous geographical extent, is generally warm to hot in the summer and cold to very cold in the winter, with snow cover typically present over the vast majority of the country's territory in the winter months, with the exception of the country's southernmost territories, the North Caucasus. Russia's far northeast, subject to an extreme subarctic climate, experiences the coldest winters of any permanently settled region in the world, with Yakutsk, the capital of the Sakha Republic, being the world's coldest major city and Oymyakon, also in the Sakha Republic, being the world's coldest permanently inhabited settlement.

== Dynamics ==
Average temperatures in Russia

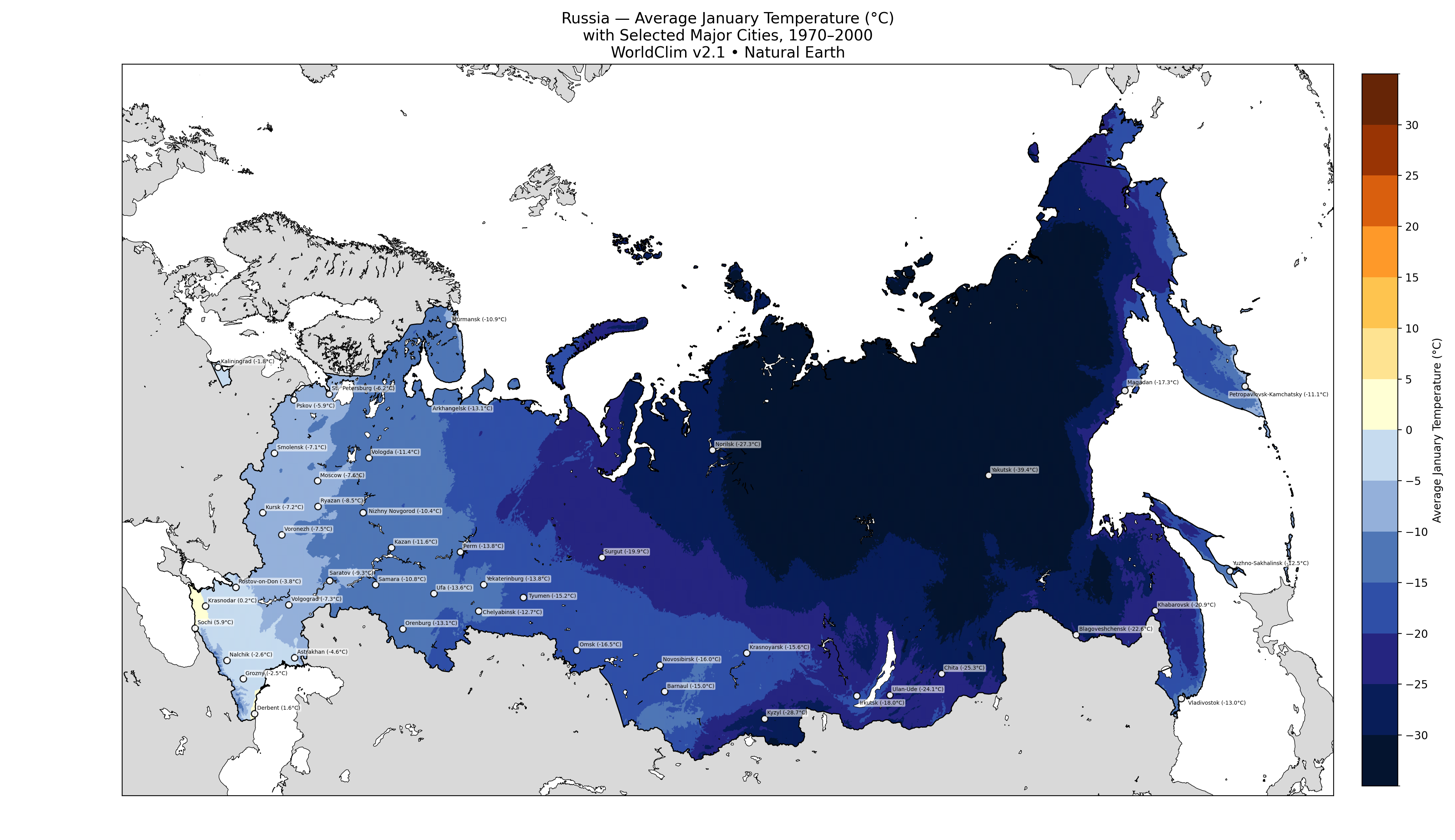
Map of Russia showing the average air temperature in January

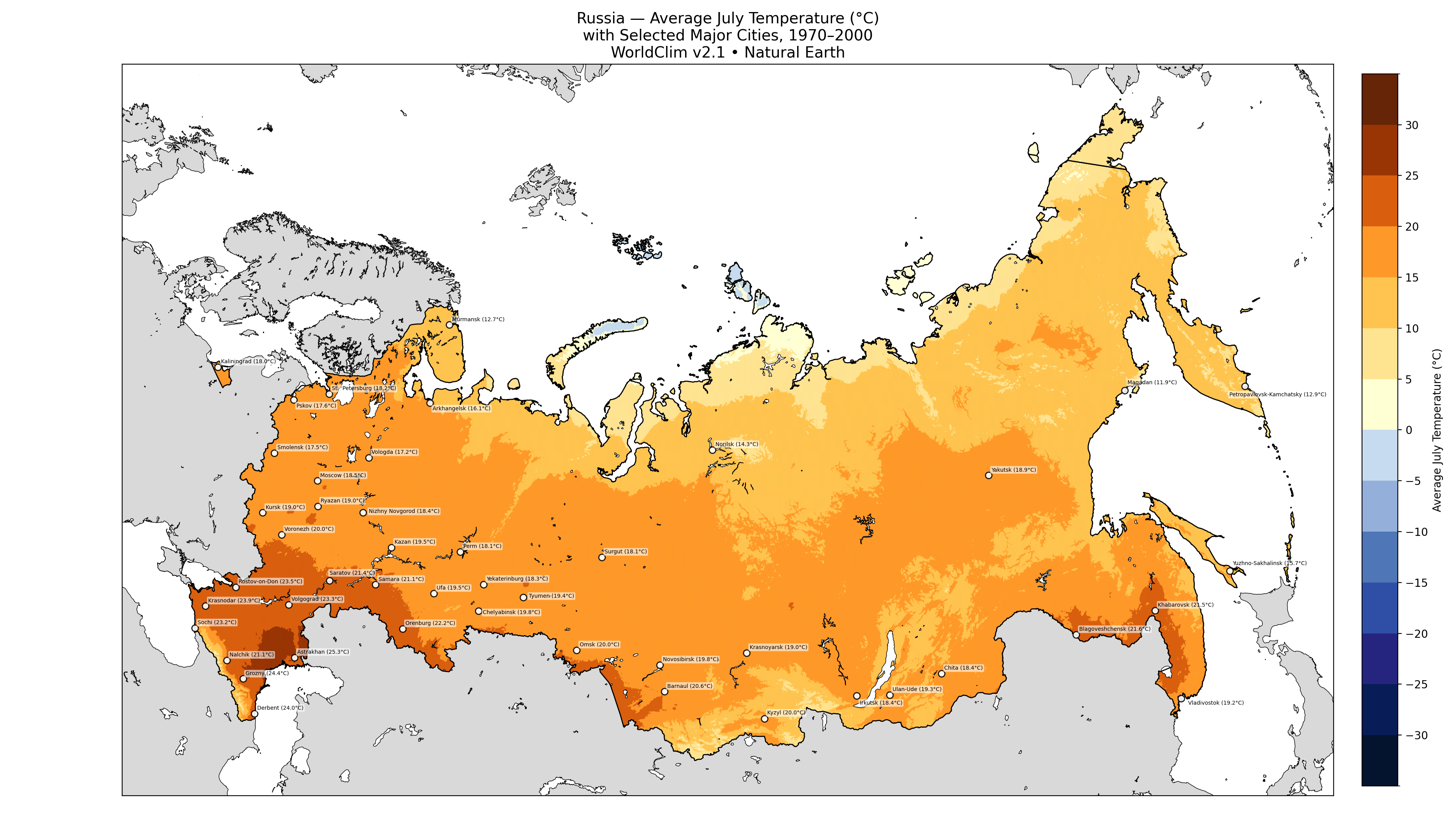
Map of Russia showing the average air temperature in July

Due to the moderating influence of the Atlantic or Pacific, most areas of the country in European Russia, in the south of West Siberia and in the south of the Russian Far East, including the cities of Moscow and Saint Petersburg, experience a humid continental climate. (Köppen's Dfb, Dfa, Dwb, Dwa, Dsb, Dsa types). Most of Northern European Russia and Siberia between the Scandinavian Peninsula and the Pacific Ocean has a subarctic climate, with extremely severe winters (Dfd, Dwd, Dsd) in the inner regions of Northeast Siberia (mostly the Sakha Republic) with the record low temperature of −67.8 °C or −90.0 °F), and more moderate (Dwc, Dfc, Dsc) elsewhere.

The strip of land along the shore of the Arctic Ocean, as well as the Arctic islands, have a polar climate, namely, an ice cap climate (EF) on some of the islands, and a tundra climate (ET) elsewhere. A small portion of the Black Sea coast, most notably in Sochi, possesses a humid subtropical climate (Köppen's Cfa) with unusually wet winters. Winter is dry compared to summer in many regions of East Siberia and the Far East (Dwa, Dwb, Dwc, Dwd types), while other parts of the country experience more even precipitation across seasons. Winter precipitation in most parts of the country usually falls as snow. The region along the Lower Volga and Caspian Sea coast, as well as some areas of southernmost Siberia, possess a semi-arid climate (BSk) and an arid climate (BWk). The city of Kaliningrad has an Oceanic climate (Cfb, Cfc) due to its relatively mild winters (monthly means above −3 °C (27 °F)) and cool summers.

About 65% of the Russian territory is underlain by permafrost.

== Temperature records ==
Climate data for Russia
Month	Jan	Feb	Mar	Apr	May	Jun	Jul	Aug	Sep	Oct	Nov	Dec	Year
Record high °C (°F)	26.7 (80.1)	28.3 (82.9)	33.5 (92.3)	36.8 (98.2)	39.7 (103.5)	43.7 (110.7)	45.4 (113.7)	45.0 (113.0)	41.5 (106.7)	36.3 (97.3)	31.0 (87.8)	28.1 (82.6)	45.4 (113.7)
Record low °C (°F)	−67.8 (−90.0)	−67.8 (−90.0)	−60.6 (−77.1)	−57.2 (−71.0)	−35.8 (−32.4)	−22.2 (−8.0)	−9.3 (15.3)	−17.1 (1.2)	−27.6 (−17.7)	−48.7 (−55.7)	−62.2 (−80.0)	−64.8 (−84.6)	−67.8 (−90.0)
Source 1: Pogoda.ru.net - Climate Monitor — Meteo.ru - Baseline Climatological Data Sets
Source 2: NOAA NCDC - Climate Data Online

=== Extreme highs ===
Month	Temperature	Date	Location
January	26.7 °C (80.1 °F)	4 January 1979	Derbent, Dagestan Republic
February	28.2 °C (82.8 °F)	28 February 2020	Kasumkent, Dagestan Republic
March	33.5 °C (92.3 °F)	29 March 1901	Maykop, Adygea Republic
April	36.8 °C (98.2 °F)	12 April 1998	Armavir, Krasnodar Krai
May	39.7 °C (103.5 °F)	22 May 2021	Khasavyurt, Republic of Dagestan
June	43.7 °C (110.7 °F)	22 June 2015	Alexandrov Gay, Saratov Oblast
July	45.4 °C (113.7 °F)	12 July 2010	Utta, Kalmykia Republic
August	45 °C (113 °F)	7 August 1940	Lake Elton, Volgograd Oblast
September	41.5 °C (106.7 °F)	2 September 2010	Lake Elton, Volgograd Oblast
September	41.5 °C (106.7 °F)	2 September 2010	Kalininsk, Saratov Oblast
October	36.3 °C (97.3 °F)	2 October 1999	Armavir, Krasnodar Krai
October	36.3 °C (97.3 °F)	2 October 1999	Novoalexandrovsk, Saratov Oblast
November	31.0 °C (87.8 °F)	10 November 2016	Shatoy, Chechen Republic
December	28.1 °C (82.6 °F)	10 December 1998	Buynaksk, Dagestan Republic

=== Extreme lows ===
Month	Temperature	Date	Location
January	−67.8 °C (−90.0 °F)	15 January 1885	Verkhoyansk, Sakha Republic
February	−67.8 °C (−90.0 °F)	5,7 February 1892	Verkhoyansk, Sakha Republic
February	−67.8 °C (−90.0 °F)	6 February 1933	Oymyakon, Sakha Republic
March	−60.6 °C (−77.1 °F)	2 March 1951	Oymyakon, Sakha Republic
March	−60.6 °C (−77.1 °F)	10 March 1954	Oymyakon, Sakha Republic
April	−57.2 °C (−71.0 °F)	2 April 1896	Verkhoyansk, Sakha Republic
May	−35.8 °C (−32.4 °F)	2 May 1964	Ilirney, Chukotka AO
June	−22.2 °C (−8.0 °F)	2 June 1964	Strait of Sterlegova, Krasnoyarsk Krai
July	−9.3 °C (15.3 °F)	15 July 1966	Oymyakon, Sakha Republic
August	−17.1 °C (1.2 °F)	31 August 1969	Oymyakon, Sakha Republic
September	−27.6 °C (−17.7 °F)	29 September 1965	Ilirney, Chukotka AO
October	−48.7 °C (−55.7 °F)	29 October 1915	Verkhoyansk, Sakha Republic
November	−62.2 °C (−80.0 °F)	Sometime before 1940 (?)	Oymyakon, Sakha Republic
December	−64.8 °C (−84.6 °F)	21 December 1996	Shologonsky, Sakha Republic

== Averages and records by city ==
Climate data for Arkhangelsk (1991–2020, extremes 1881–present)
Month	Jan	Feb	Mar	Apr	May	Jun	Jul	Aug	Sep	Oct	Nov	Dec	Year
Record high °C (°F)	5.0 (41.0)	5.2 (41.4)	12.3 (54.1)	25.3 (77.5)	32.1 (89.8)	33.0 (91.4)	34.4 (93.9)	33.4 (92.1)	27.7 (81.9)	18.3 (64.9)	10.0 (50.0)	5.8 (42.4)	34.4 (93.9)
Mean daily maximum °C (°F)	−8.4 (16.9)	−7.1 (19.2)	−1.1 (30.0)	5.6 (42.1)	13.1 (55.6)	18.7 (65.7)	22.1 (71.8)	18.6 (65.5)	12.8 (55.0)	5.0 (41.0)	−1.9 (28.6)	−5.3 (22.5)	6.0 (42.8)
Daily mean °C (°F)	−11.6 (11.1)	−10.7 (12.7)	−5.5 (22.1)	0.8 (33.4)	7.5 (45.5)	13.1 (55.6)	16.5 (61.7)	13.6 (56.5)	8.8 (47.8)	2.5 (36.5)	−4.2 (24.4)	−8.2 (17.2)	1.9 (35.4)
Mean daily minimum °C (°F)	−15.2 (4.6)	−14.4 (6.1)	−9.7 (14.5)	−3.4 (25.9)	2.5 (36.5)	7.7 (45.9)	11.5 (52.7)	9.3 (48.7)	5.6 (42.1)	0.4 (32.7)	−6.7 (19.9)	−11.3 (11.7)	−2.0 (28.4)
Record low °C (°F)	−45.2 (−49.4)	−41.2 (−42.2)	−37.1 (−34.8)	−27.3 (−17.1)	−13.7 (7.3)	−3.9 (25.0)	−0.5 (31.1)	−4.1 (24.6)	−7.5 (18.5)	−21.1 (−6.0)	−36.5 (−33.7)	−43.2 (−45.8)	−45.2 (−49.4)
Average precipitation mm (inches)	42 (1.7)	32 (1.3)	31 (1.2)	32 (1.3)	48 (1.9)	65 (2.6)	75 (3.0)	82 (3.2)	62 (2.4)	68 (2.7)	51 (2.0)	48 (1.9)	636 (25.0)
Average extreme snow depth cm (inches)	36 (14)	45 (18)	48 (19)	19 (7.5)	1 (0.4)	0 (0)	0 (0)	0 (0)	0 (0)	2 (0.8)	11 (4.3)	24 (9.4)	48 (19)
Average rainy days	2	2	4	10	17	17	18	19	22	19	9	4	143
Average snowy days	27	26	23	13	6	1	0	0.03	1	13	25	28	163
Average relative humidity (%)	85	84	80	72	68	69	75	81	85	88	89	87	80
Mean monthly sunshine hours	13	56	117	193	262	298	301	203	116	59	19	6	1,643
Source 1: Pogoda.ru.net
Source 2: NOAA (sun, 1961–1990)

Climate data for Chita (1991–2020, extremes 1890–present)
Month	Jan	Feb	Mar	Apr	May	Jun	Jul	Aug	Sep	Oct	Nov	Dec	Year
Record high °C (°F)	0.4 (32.7)	7.4 (45.3)	18.3 (64.9)	29.3 (84.7)	34.6 (94.3)	38.8 (101.8)	38.0 (100.4)	40.6 (105.1)	30.9 (87.6)	22.7 (72.9)	12.7 (54.9)	5.0 (41.0)	40.6 (105.1)
Mean daily maximum °C (°F)	−17.2 (1.0)	−9.5 (14.9)	0.0 (32.0)	9.7 (49.5)	18.2 (64.8)	24.9 (76.8)	26.7 (80.1)	23.7 (74.7)	16.8 (62.2)	7.0 (44.6)	−6.0 (21.2)	−15.7 (3.7)	6.6 (43.9)
Daily mean °C (°F)	−24.6 (−12.3)	−18.3 (−0.9)	−8.1 (17.4)	2.2 (36.0)	10.2 (50.4)	17.1 (62.8)	19.5 (67.1)	16.6 (61.9)	9.2 (48.6)	−0.1 (31.8)	−12.5 (9.5)	−22.1 (−7.8)	−0.9 (30.4)
Mean daily minimum °C (°F)	−30.4 (−22.7)	−25.9 (−14.6)	−16.0 (3.2)	−5.0 (23.0)	2.2 (36.0)	9.2 (48.6)	12.7 (54.9)	10.4 (50.7)	2.7 (36.9)	−6.0 (21.2)	−18.0 (−0.4)	−27.4 (−17.3)	−7.6 (18.3)
Record low °C (°F)	−49.6 (−57.3)	−48.0 (−54.4)	−45.3 (−49.5)	−29.6 (−21.3)	−13.3 (8.1)	−5.4 (22.3)	0.1 (32.2)	−9.2 (15.4)	−10.8 (12.6)	−33.1 (−27.6)	−41.1 (−42.0)	−47.8 (−54.0)	−49.6 (−57.3)
Average precipitation mm (inches)	3 (0.1)	2 (0.1)	4 (0.2)	12 (0.5)	27 (1.1)	59 (2.3)	88 (3.5)	85 (3.3)	41 (1.6)	10 (0.4)	5 (0.2)	5 (0.2)	341 (13.4)
Average extreme snow depth cm (inches)	7 (2.8)	7 (2.8)	2 (0.8)	1 (0.4)	0 (0)	0 (0)	0 (0)	0 (0)	0 (0)	0 (0)	3 (1.2)	6 (2.4)	7 (2.8)
Average rainy days	0	0	1	5	11	16	18	17	13	5	0.2	0	86
Average snowy days	15	9	8	7	3	0.03	0	0	1	7	11	15	76
Average relative humidity (%)	76	72	59	47	46	58	68	73	66	61	70	77	64
Mean monthly sunshine hours	139	179	239	242	277	279	247	226	212	190	134	108	2,472
Source 1: Pogoda.ru.net
Source 2: NOAA (sun, 1961–1990)

Climate data for Irkutsk (1991–2020, extremes 1820–present)
Month	Jan	Feb	Mar	Apr	May	Jun	Jul	Aug	Sep	Oct	Nov	Dec	Year
Record high °C (°F)	2.3 (36.1)	10.2 (50.4)	20.0 (68.0)	29.2 (84.6)	34.5 (94.1)	35.6 (96.1)	37.2 (99.0)	34.7 (94.5)	29.7 (85.5)	25.6 (78.1)	14.4 (57.9)	5.3 (41.5)	37.2 (99.0)
Mean daily maximum °C (°F)	−12.7 (9.1)	−7.5 (18.5)	1.2 (34.2)	10.5 (50.9)	18.1 (64.6)	23.8 (74.8)	25.7 (78.3)	22.9 (73.2)	16.1 (61.0)	7.9 (46.2)	−2.7 (27.1)	−10.8 (12.6)	7.7 (45.9)
Daily mean °C (°F)	−17.6 (0.3)	−14.1 (6.6)	−5.5 (22.1)	3.6 (38.5)	10.4 (50.7)	16.4 (61.5)	19.0 (66.2)	16.4 (61.5)	9.5 (49.1)	2.0 (35.6)	−7.6 (18.3)	−15.4 (4.3)	1.4 (34.5)
Mean daily minimum °C (°F)	−21.4 (−6.5)	−19.1 (−2.4)	−11.1 (12.0)	−1.9 (28.6)	3.7 (38.7)	10.1 (50.2)	13.5 (56.3)	11.4 (52.5)	4.6 (40.3)	−2.4 (27.7)	−11.5 (11.3)	−19.1 (−2.4)	−3.6 (25.5)
Record low °C (°F)	−49.7 (−57.5)	−44.7 (−48.5)	−37.3 (−35.1)	−31.8 (−25.2)	−14.3 (6.3)	−6 (21)	0.4 (32.7)	−2.7 (27.1)	−11.9 (10.6)	−30.5 (−22.9)	−40.4 (−40.7)	−46.3 (−51.3)	−49.7 (−57.5)
Average precipitation mm (inches)	14 (0.6)	9 (0.4)	12 (0.5)	21 (0.8)	36 (1.4)	69 (2.7)	107 (4.2)	96 (3.8)	53 (2.1)	21 (0.8)	20 (0.8)	19 (0.7)	477 (18.8)
Average extreme snow depth cm (inches)	24 (9.4)	28 (11)	18 (7.1)	1 (0.4)	0 (0)	0 (0)	0 (0)	0 (0)	0 (0)	1 (0.4)	8 (3.1)	18 (7.1)	28 (11)
Average rainy days	0	0.04	1	9	15	18	18	17	16	9	2	0	105
Average snowy days	21	16	13	11	3	0.2	0	0	2	10	20	23	119
Average relative humidity (%)	82	76	65	56	55	67	74	78	76	73	79	85	72
Mean monthly sunshine hours	93	149	207	223	266	264	243	218	182	152	93	62	2,142
Source 1: Pogoda.ru.net
Source 2: NOAA (sun, 1961–1990)

Climate data for Kaliningrad (1991–2020, extremes 1848–present)
Month	Jan	Feb	Mar	Apr	May	Jun	Jul	Aug	Sep	Oct	Nov	Dec	Year
Record high °C (°F)	12.7 (54.9)	16.9 (62.4)	23.0 (73.4)	28.5 (83.3)	30.6 (87.1)	34.0 (93.2)	36.3 (97.3)	36.5 (97.7)	33.8 (92.8)	26.4 (79.5)	19.4 (66.9)	13.3 (55.9)	36.5 (97.7)
Mean daily maximum °C (°F)	1.1 (34.0)	2.1 (35.8)	6.1 (43.0)	13.1 (55.6)	18.2 (64.8)	21.3 (70.3)	23.5 (74.3)	23.3 (73.9)	18.4 (65.1)	12.2 (54.0)	6.2 (43.2)	2.6 (36.7)	12.3 (54.1)
Daily mean °C (°F)	−1.2 (29.8)	−0.6 (30.9)	2.4 (36.3)	7.9 (46.2)	12.7 (54.9)	16.1 (61.0)	18.5 (65.3)	18.1 (64.6)	13.5 (56.3)	8.4 (47.1)	3.9 (39.0)	0.4 (32.7)	8.3 (46.9)
Mean daily minimum °C (°F)	−3.5 (25.7)	−3.0 (26.6)	−0.8 (30.6)	3.4 (38.1)	7.5 (45.5)	11.3 (52.3)	13.9 (57.0)	13.3 (55.9)	9.4 (48.9)	5.2 (41.4)	1.7 (35.1)	−1.8 (28.8)	4.7 (40.5)
Record low °C (°F)	−32.5 (−26.5)	−33.3 (−27.9)	−21.7 (−7.1)	−5.8 (21.6)	−3.1 (26.4)	0.7 (33.3)	4.5 (40.1)	1.6 (34.9)	−2.0 (28.4)	−11.2 (11.8)	−18.7 (−1.7)	−25.6 (−14.1)	−33.3 (−27.9)
Average precipitation mm (inches)	68 (2.7)	54 (2.1)	49 (1.9)	38 (1.5)	52 (2.0)	69 (2.7)	91 (3.6)	91 (3.6)	73 (2.9)	86 (3.4)	76 (3.0)	69 (2.7)	816 (32.1)
Average extreme snow depth cm (inches)	7 (2.8)	7 (2.8)	3 (1.2)	0 (0)	0 (0)	0 (0)	0 (0)	0 (0)	0 (0)	0 (0)	2 (0.8)	5 (2.0)	7 (2.8)
Average rainy days	14	13	14	14	14	16	15	16	17	18	18	16	185
Average snowy days	15	15	10	3	0.1	0	0	0	0	1	7	13	64
Average relative humidity (%)	85	83	78	72	71	74	75	77	81	83	86	87	79
Mean monthly sunshine hours	35	61	120	171	253	264	257	228	158	96	38	26	1,707
Source 1: Pogoda.ru.net
Source 2: NOAA (sun 1961–1990)

Climate data for Khabarovsk (1991–2020 normals, extremes 1953–present)
Month	Jan	Feb	Mar	Apr	May	Jun	Jul	Aug	Sep	Oct	Nov	Dec	Year
Record high °C (°F)	0.6 (33.1)	6.3 (43.3)	17.0 (62.6)	28.6 (83.5)	31.5 (88.7)	36.4 (97.5)	35.7 (96.3)	35.6 (96.1)	29.8 (85.6)	26.4 (79.5)	15.5 (59.9)	6.6 (43.9)	36.4 (97.5)
Mean daily maximum °C (°F)	−14.9 (5.2)	−9.9 (14.2)	−1.0 (30.2)	10.5 (50.9)	19.2 (66.6)	23.8 (74.8)	26.8 (80.2)	24.9 (76.8)	19.7 (67.5)	10.6 (51.1)	−2.8 (27.0)	−13.6 (7.5)	7.8 (46.0)
Daily mean °C (°F)	−19.2 (−2.6)	−14.9 (5.2)	−5.9 (21.4)	4.8 (40.6)	12.9 (55.2)	18.0 (64.4)	21.4 (70.5)	19.9 (67.8)	14.1 (57.4)	5.4 (41.7)	−6.9 (19.6)	−17.4 (0.7)	2.7 (36.9)
Mean daily minimum °C (°F)	−23.1 (−9.6)	−19.6 (−3.3)	−10.7 (12.7)	−0.1 (31.8)	7.3 (45.1)	12.8 (55.0)	16.8 (62.2)	15.7 (60.3)	9.4 (48.9)	1.0 (33.8)	−10.4 (13.3)	−20.9 (−5.6)	−1.8 (28.8)
Record low °C (°F)	−40.0 (−40.0)	−35.1 (−31.2)	−28.9 (−20.0)	−15.1 (4.8)	−3.1 (26.4)	2.2 (36.0)	6.8 (44.2)	4.9 (40.8)	−3.3 (26.1)	−15.6 (3.9)	−27.7 (−17.9)	−36.7 (−34.1)	−40.0 (−40.0)
Average precipitation mm (inches)	13 (0.5)	12 (0.5)	22 (0.9)	37 (1.5)	70 (2.8)	84 (3.3)	137 (5.4)	143 (5.6)	85 (3.3)	48 (1.9)	26 (1.0)	19 (0.7)	696 (27.4)
Average extreme snow depth cm (inches)	14 (5.5)	16 (6.3)	12 (4.7)	1 (0.4)	0 (0)	0 (0)	0 (0)	0 (0)	0 (0)	1 (0.4)	5 (2.0)	10 (3.9)	16 (6.3)
Average rainy days	0	0	1	10	16	15	15	17	15	11	2	0	102
Average snowy days	14	11	11	6	1	0	0	0	0.1	4	12	14	73
Average relative humidity (%)	75	72	68	63	65	74	79	83	78	67	69	73	72
Mean monthly sunshine hours	147	181	231	213	242	262	248	217	212	189	159	145	2,446
Source 1: Погода и Климат
Source 2: NOAA (sun, 1961–1990)

Climate data for Krasnoyarsk (1991–2020, extremes 1891–present)
Month	Jan	Feb	Mar	Apr	May	Jun	Jul	Aug	Sep	Oct	Nov	Dec	Year
Record high °C (°F)	6.0 (42.8)	8.5 (47.3)	18.5 (65.3)	31.4 (88.5)	34.0 (93.2)	34.8 (94.6)	36.4 (97.5)	35.1 (95.2)	31.3 (88.3)	24.5 (76.1)	13.6 (56.5)	8.6 (47.5)	36.4 (97.5)
Mean daily maximum °C (°F)	−11.6 (11.1)	−7.5 (18.5)	0.7 (33.3)	9.3 (48.7)	17.1 (62.8)	23.5 (74.3)	25.2 (77.4)	22.2 (72.0)	14.6 (58.3)	6.7 (44.1)	−3.6 (25.5)	−9.3 (15.3)	7.3 (45.1)
Daily mean °C (°F)	−15.6 (3.9)	−12.3 (9.9)	−4.9 (23.2)	3.4 (38.1)	10.4 (50.7)	16.9 (62.4)	19.1 (66.4)	16.1 (61.0)	9.1 (48.4)	2.3 (36.1)	−7.3 (18.9)	−13.2 (8.2)	2.0 (35.6)
Mean daily minimum °C (°F)	−19.2 (−2.6)	−16.3 (2.7)	−9.4 (15.1)	−1.4 (29.5)	4.7 (40.5)	11.1 (52.0)	13.7 (56.7)	11.2 (52.2)	5.0 (41.0)	−1.3 (29.7)	−10.7 (12.7)	−16.9 (1.6)	−2.5 (27.5)
Record low °C (°F)	−52.8 (−63.0)	−41.6 (−42.9)	−38.7 (−37.7)	−25.7 (−14.3)	−11.2 (11.8)	−3.6 (25.5)	3.3 (37.9)	−1.0 (30.2)	−9.6 (14.7)	−25.1 (−13.2)	−42.3 (−44.1)	−47.0 (−52.6)	−52.8 (−63.0)
Average precipitation mm (inches)	17 (0.7)	15 (0.6)	19 (0.7)	29 (1.1)	48 (1.9)	66 (2.6)	70 (2.8)	76 (3.0)	55 (2.2)	42 (1.7)	39 (1.5)	31 (1.2)	507 (20.0)
Average extreme snow depth cm (inches)	16 (6.3)	16 (6.3)	13 (5.1)	3 (1.2)	0 (0)	0 (0)	0 (0)	0 (0)	0 (0)	2 (0.8)	7 (2.8)	14 (5.5)	16 (6.3)
Average rainy days	0.3	0.4	2	9	17	19	18	18	19	13	4	0.3	120
Average snowy days	24	21	17	14	4	0.1	0	0.03	2	14	23	25	144
Average relative humidity (%)	73	70	64	58	54	64	72	76	75	71	74	73	69
Mean monthly sunshine hours	63	100	171	216	251	280	281	237	160	111	58	41	1,969
Source 1: Pogoda.ru.net
Source 2: NOAA (sun only 1961–1990)

Climate data for Moscow (VDNKh) WMO ID: 27612; coordinates 55°49′53″N 37°37′20″E; elevation: 147 m (482 ft); 1991–2020 normals, extremes 1879–present
Month	Jan	Feb	Mar	Apr	May	Jun	Jul	Aug	Sep	Oct	Nov	Dec	Year
Record high °C (°F)	8.6 (47.5)	8.3 (46.9)	19.7 (67.5)	28.9 (84.0)	33.2 (91.8)	34.8 (94.6)	38.2 (100.8)	37.3 (99.1)	32.3 (90.1)	24.0 (75.2)	16.2 (61.2)	9.6 (49.3)	38.2 (100.8)
Mean maximum °C (°F)	2.8 (37.0)	3.5 (38.3)	10.8 (51.4)	21.7 (71.1)	27.3 (81.1)	29.5 (85.1)	31.0 (87.8)	30.0 (86.0)	24.7 (76.5)	17.9 (64.2)	8.9 (48.0)	4.2 (39.6)	31.9 (89.4)
Mean daily maximum °C (°F)	−3.9 (25.0)	−3 (27)	3.0 (37.4)	11.7 (53.1)	19.0 (66.2)	22.4 (72.3)	24.7 (76.5)	22.7 (72.9)	16.4 (61.5)	8.9 (48.0)	1.6 (34.9)	−2.3 (27.9)	10.1 (50.2)
Daily mean °C (°F)	−6.2 (20.8)	−5.9 (21.4)	−0.7 (30.7)	6.9 (44.4)	13.6 (56.5)	17.3 (63.1)	19.7 (67.5)	17.6 (63.7)	11.9 (53.4)	5.8 (42.4)	−0.5 (31.1)	−4.4 (24.1)	6.3 (43.3)
Mean daily minimum °C (°F)	−8.7 (16.3)	−8.8 (16.2)	−4.2 (24.4)	2.3 (36.1)	8.1 (46.6)	12.2 (54.0)	14.8 (58.6)	13.0 (55.4)	8.0 (46.4)	3.0 (37.4)	−2.4 (27.7)	−6.5 (20.3)	2.6 (36.7)
Mean minimum °C (°F)	−21.1 (−6.0)	−20.9 (−5.6)	−12.8 (9.0)	−5.1 (22.8)	0.3 (32.5)	5.8 (42.4)	9.7 (49.5)	6.8 (44.2)	0.9 (33.6)	−4.6 (23.7)	−11.7 (10.9)	−17.3 (0.9)	−23.9 (−11.0)
Record low °C (°F)	−42.1 (−43.8)	−38.2 (−36.8)	−32.4 (−26.3)	−21 (−6)	−7.5 (18.5)	−2.3 (27.9)	1.3 (34.3)	−1.2 (29.8)	−8.5 (16.7)	−20.3 (−4.5)	−32.8 (−27.0)	−38.8 (−37.8)	−42.1 (−43.8)
Average precipitation mm (inches)	53 (2.1)	44 (1.7)	39 (1.5)	37 (1.5)	61 (2.4)	78 (3.1)	84 (3.3)	78 (3.1)	66 (2.6)	70 (2.8)	52 (2.0)	51 (2.0)	713 (28.1)
Average extreme snow depth cm (inches)	24 (9.4)	35 (14)	29 (11)	2 (0.8)	0 (0)	0 (0)	0 (0)	0 (0)	0 (0)	0 (0)	4 (1.6)	12 (4.7)	35 (14)
Average rainy days	8	6	9	15	16	16	15	16	16	17	13	8	155
Average snowy days	25	23	15	6	1	0	0	0	0.3	5	17	24	116
Average relative humidity (%)	85	81	74	68	67	72	74	78	82	83	86	86	78
Mean monthly sunshine hours	33	72	128	170	265	279	271	238	147	78	32	18	1,731
Mean daily sunshine hours	1.1	2.5	4.1	5.7	8.5	9.3	8.7	7.7	4.9	2.5	1.1	0.6	4.7
Mean daily daylight hours	7.9	9.7	11.9	14.3	16.3	17.4	16.8	14.9	12.7	10.5	8.4	7.2	12.3
Percentage possible sunshine	14	27	35	40	53	53	52	51	38	24	13	8	34
Average ultraviolet index	0	1	2	3	5	6	6	5	3	1	1	0	3
Source 1: Pogoda.ru.net, Thermograph.ru, Meteoweb.ru (sunshine hours)
Source 2: Weather Atlas (UV)

Climate data for Murmansk (1991–2020, extremes 1918–present)
Month	Jan	Feb	Mar	Apr	May	Jun	Jul	Aug	Sep	Oct	Nov	Dec	Year
Record high °C (°F)	7.0 (44.6)	6.6 (43.9)	9.0 (48.2)	17.6 (63.7)	29.4 (84.9)	30.8 (87.4)	32.9 (91.2)	30.2 (86.4)	24.2 (75.6)	15.0 (59.0)	9.6 (49.3)	7.2 (45.0)	32.9 (91.2)
Mean daily maximum °C (°F)	−6.5 (20.3)	−6.4 (20.5)	−1.9 (28.6)	2.9 (37.2)	8.4 (47.1)	13.8 (56.8)	17.7 (63.9)	15.3 (59.5)	10.7 (51.3)	3.6 (38.5)	−1.8 (28.8)	−4.1 (24.6)	4.3 (39.7)
Daily mean °C (°F)	−9.6 (14.7)	−9.3 (15.3)	−5.1 (22.8)	−0.3 (31.5)	4.6 (40.3)	9.4 (48.9)	13.2 (55.8)	11.5 (52.7)	7.6 (45.7)	1.6 (34.9)	−4.0 (24.8)	−6.8 (19.8)	1.1 (34.0)
Mean daily minimum °C (°F)	−12.7 (9.1)	−12.3 (9.9)	−8.2 (17.2)	−3.3 (26.1)	1.5 (34.7)	5.9 (42.6)	9.6 (49.3)	8.3 (46.9)	5.1 (41.2)	−0.3 (31.5)	−6.2 (20.8)	−9.6 (14.7)	−1.8 (28.8)
Record low °C (°F)	−39.4 (−38.9)	−38.6 (−37.5)	−32.6 (−26.7)	−24.0 (−11.2)	−10.3 (13.5)	−2.8 (27.0)	1.7 (35.1)	−2.0 (28.4)	−10.1 (13.8)	−21.2 (−6.2)	−32.2 (−26.0)	−34.9 (−30.8)	−39.4 (−38.9)
Average precipitation mm (inches)	34 (1.3)	24 (0.9)	29 (1.1)	29 (1.1)	37 (1.5)	56 (2.2)	66 (2.6)	71 (2.8)	54 (2.1)	56 (2.2)	36 (1.4)	37 (1.5)	529 (20.8)
Average extreme snow depth cm (inches)	26 (10)	28 (11)	30 (12)	19 (7.5)	2 (0.8)	0 (0)	0 (0)	0 (0)	0 (0)	3 (1.2)	11 (4.3)	19 (7.5)	30 (12)
Average rainy days	2	2	3	9	18	22	22	22	24	17	5	3	149
Average snowy days	27	26	24	19	14	4	0.03	0.1	2	16	24	27	183
Average relative humidity (%)	84	83	79	73	72	70	75	79	80	83	86	85	79
Mean monthly sunshine hours	3	33	122	182	192	228	236	154	89	47	7	0	1,293
Source 1: Pogoda.ru.net
Source 2: NOAA (sun, 1961–1990)

Climate data for Nizhny Novgorod (1991–2020, extremes 1835–present)
Month	Jan	Feb	Mar	Apr	May	Jun	Jul	Aug	Sep	Oct	Nov	Dec	Year
Record high °C (°F)	5.7 (42.3)	7.2 (45.0)	17.3 (63.1)	26.3 (79.3)	32.5 (90.5)	36.3 (97.3)	38.2 (100.8)	38.0 (100.4)	31.0 (87.8)	24.2 (75.6)	13.8 (56.8)	8.5 (47.3)	38.2 (100.8)
Mean daily maximum °C (°F)	−5.9 (21.4)	−4.8 (23.4)	1.5 (34.7)	11.0 (51.8)	19.3 (66.7)	22.7 (72.9)	24.9 (76.8)	22.6 (72.7)	16.2 (61.2)	8.3 (46.9)	0.1 (32.2)	−4.3 (24.3)	9.3 (48.7)
Daily mean °C (°F)	−8.6 (16.5)	−8.0 (17.6)	−2.2 (28.0)	6.1 (43.0)	13.5 (56.3)	17.3 (63.1)	19.7 (67.5)	17.4 (63.3)	11.7 (53.1)	5.0 (41.0)	−2.1 (28.2)	−6.7 (19.9)	5.3 (41.5)
Mean daily minimum °C (°F)	−11.1 (12.0)	−10.7 (12.7)	−5.2 (22.6)	2.2 (36.0)	8.6 (47.5)	12.6 (54.7)	15.1 (59.2)	13.2 (55.8)	8.3 (46.9)	2.5 (36.5)	−4.0 (24.8)	−8.9 (16.0)	1.9 (35.4)
Record low °C (°F)	−41.2 (−42.2)	−37.2 (−35.0)	−28.3 (−18.9)	−19.7 (−3.5)	−6.9 (19.6)	−1.8 (28.8)	5.1 (41.2)	0.9 (33.6)	−5.5 (22.1)	−16.0 (3.2)	−30.9 (−23.6)	−41.4 (−42.5)	−41.4 (−42.5)
Average precipitation mm (inches)	50 (2.0)	40 (1.6)	40 (1.6)	40 (1.6)	42 (1.7)	73 (2.9)	75 (3.0)	68 (2.7)	59 (2.3)	67 (2.6)	52 (2.0)	59 (2.3)	665 (26.2)
Average extreme snow depth cm (inches)	31 (12)	43 (17)	40 (16)	5 (2.0)	0 (0)	0 (0)	0 (0)	0 (0)	0 (0)	1 (0.4)	6 (2.4)	16 (6.3)	43 (17)
Average rainy days	5	4	5	13	17	19	18	18	18	18	10	6	151
Average snowy days	28	24	18	7	1	0.1	0	0	1	8	20	26	133
Average relative humidity (%)	86	81	74	64	60	69	70	74	79	82	87	86	76
Mean monthly sunshine hours	43	79	145	196	275	287	280	238	152	81	38	25	1,839
Source 1: Pogoda.ru.net
Source 2: NOAA (sun 1961–1990)

Climate data for Saint Petersburg (1991–2020 normals, extremes 1743–present)
Month	Jan	Feb	Mar	Apr	May	Jun	Jul	Aug	Sep	Oct	Nov	Dec	Year
Record high °C (°F)	8.7 (47.7)	10.2 (50.4)	16.1 (61.0)	25.3 (77.5)	33.0 (91.4)	35.9 (96.6)	35.3 (95.5)	37.1 (98.8)	30.4 (86.7)	21.0 (69.8)	12.3 (54.1)	10.9 (51.6)	37.1 (98.8)
Mean daily maximum °C (°F)	−2.5 (27.5)	−2.4 (27.7)	2.3 (36.1)	9.5 (49.1)	16.3 (61.3)	20.5 (68.9)	23.3 (73.9)	21.4 (70.5)	15.9 (60.6)	8.7 (47.7)	2.8 (37.0)	−0.5 (31.1)	9.6 (49.3)
Daily mean °C (°F)	−4.8 (23.4)	−5.0 (23.0)	−1.0 (30.2)	5.2 (41.4)	11.5 (52.7)	16.1 (61.0)	19.1 (66.4)	17.4 (63.3)	12.4 (54.3)	6.2 (43.2)	0.9 (33.6)	−2.5 (27.5)	6.3 (43.3)
Mean daily minimum °C (°F)	−7.2 (19.0)	−7.6 (18.3)	−4.0 (24.8)	1.7 (35.1)	7.2 (45.0)	12.2 (54.0)	15.3 (59.5)	13.9 (57.0)	9.4 (48.9)	4.1 (39.4)	−0.9 (30.4)	−4.5 (23.9)	3.3 (37.9)
Record low °C (°F)	−35.9 (−32.6)	−35.2 (−31.4)	−29.9 (−21.8)	−21.8 (−7.2)	−6.6 (20.1)	0.1 (32.2)	4.9 (40.8)	1.3 (34.3)	−3.1 (26.4)	−12.9 (8.8)	−22.2 (−8.0)	−34.4 (−29.9)	−35.9 (−32.6)
Average precipitation mm (inches)	46 (1.8)	36 (1.4)	36 (1.4)	37 (1.5)	47 (1.9)	69 (2.7)	84 (3.3)	87 (3.4)	57 (2.2)	64 (2.5)	56 (2.2)	51 (2.0)	670 (26.4)
Average extreme snow depth cm (inches)	15 (5.9)	19 (7.5)	14 (5.5)	1 (0.4)	0 (0)	0 (0)	0 (0)	0 (0)	0 (0)	0 (0)	3 (1.2)	9 (3.5)	19 (7.5)
Average rainy days	9	7	10	13	16	18	17	17	20	20	16	10	173
Average snowy days	25	23	16	8	1	0.1	0	0	0.1	5	16	23	117
Average relative humidity (%)	86	84	79	69	65	69	71	76	80	83	86	87	78
Mean monthly sunshine hours	18.9	45.5	120.5	177.9	255.6	254.3	267.7	228.1	134.8	61.8	23.0	8.1	1,596.2
Source 1: Pogoda.ru.net
Source 2: NOAA

Climate data for Samara (1991–2020, extremes 1852–present)
Month	Jan	Feb	Mar	Apr	May	Jun	Jul	Aug	Sep	Oct	Nov	Dec	Year
Record high °C (°F)	5.2 (41.4)	6.8 (44.2)	16.7 (62.1)	31.1 (88.0)	35.9 (96.6)	38.4 (101.1)	39.4 (102.9)	39.9 (103.8)	34.0 (93.2)	26.0 (78.8)	14.7 (58.5)	7.3 (45.1)	39.9 (103.8)
Mean daily maximum °C (°F)	−6.7 (19.9)	−5.8 (21.6)	0.9 (33.6)	12.4 (54.3)	21.4 (70.5)	25.3 (77.5)	27.3 (81.1)	25.5 (77.9)	19.0 (66.2)	10.3 (50.5)	0.7 (33.3)	−5.2 (22.6)	10.4 (50.7)
Daily mean °C (°F)	−9.6 (14.7)	−9.3 (15.3)	−2.9 (26.8)	7.5 (45.5)	15.6 (60.1)	19.8 (67.6)	21.9 (71.4)	19.9 (67.8)	13.8 (56.8)	6.5 (43.7)	−1.7 (28.9)	−7.8 (18.0)	6.1 (43.0)
Mean daily minimum °C (°F)	−12.3 (9.9)	−12.5 (9.5)	−6.2 (20.8)	3.2 (37.8)	10.3 (50.5)	14.7 (58.5)	16.8 (62.2)	15.0 (59.0)	9.6 (49.3)	3.5 (38.3)	−3.8 (25.2)	−10.2 (13.6)	2.3 (36.1)
Record low °C (°F)	−44.0 (−47.2)	−36.9 (−34.4)	−36.1 (−33.0)	−20.9 (−5.6)	−4.9 (23.2)	−0.4 (31.3)	6.0 (42.8)	4.1 (39.4)	−3.4 (25.9)	−15.7 (3.7)	−28.1 (−18.6)	−41.3 (−42.3)	−44.0 (−47.2)
Average precipitation mm (inches)	56 (2.2)	44 (1.7)	42 (1.7)	40 (1.6)	38 (1.5)	48 (1.9)	47 (1.9)	41 (1.6)	46 (1.8)	49 (1.9)	46 (1.8)	52 (2.0)	549 (21.6)
Average extreme snow depth cm (inches)	37 (15)	54 (21)	50 (20)	7 (2.8)	0 (0)	0 (0)	0 (0)	0 (0)	0 (0)	0 (0)	5 (2.0)	19 (7.5)	54 (21)
Average rainy days	4	3	5	11	14	15	14	12	14	14	10	6	122
Average snowy days	24	20	14	4	1	0.1	0	0	0.3	4	15	22	104
Average relative humidity (%)	83	80	79	67	58	64	67	69	73	76	83	83	74
Mean monthly sunshine hours	64	102	149	214	305	303	310	275	190	108	47	46	2,113
Source 1: Pogoda.ru.net
Source 2: NOAA (sun, 1961–1990)

Climate data for Sochi (1991–2020, extremes 1870–present)
Month	Jan	Feb	Mar	Apr	May	Jun	Jul	Aug	Sep	Oct	Nov	Dec	Year
Record high °C (°F)	22.4 (72.3)	23.5 (74.3)	30.0 (86.0)	33.7 (92.7)	34.7 (94.5)	35.2 (95.4)	35.2 (95.4)	38.5 (101.3)	36.0 (96.8)	32.1 (89.8)	29.1 (84.4)	23.5 (74.3)	39.4 (102.9)
Mean daily maximum °C (°F)	9.9 (49.8)	10.4 (50.7)	12.7 (54.9)	17.0 (62.6)	21.2 (70.2)	25.4 (77.7)	27.9 (82.2)	28.6 (83.5)	25.2 (77.4)	20.7 (69.3)	15.6 (60.1)	12.0 (53.6)	18.9 (66.0)
Daily mean °C (°F)	6.3 (43.3)	6.5 (43.7)	8.6 (47.5)	12.3 (54.1)	16.6 (61.9)	20.9 (69.6)	23.7 (74.7)	24.3 (75.7)	20.5 (68.9)	16.2 (61.2)	11.4 (52.5)	8.3 (46.9)	14.6 (58.3)
Mean daily minimum °C (°F)	3.8 (38.8)	3.7 (38.7)	5.6 (42.1)	9.0 (48.2)	13.3 (55.9)	17.4 (63.3)	20.0 (68.0)	20.7 (69.3)	16.9 (62.4)	13.1 (55.6)	8.5 (47.3)	5.7 (42.3)	11.5 (52.7)
Record low °C (°F)	−13.4 (7.9)	−12.6 (9.3)	−7.0 (19.4)	−5.0 (23.0)	3.0 (37.4)	7.1 (44.8)	12.6 (54.7)	10.4 (50.7)	2.7 (36.9)	−3.2 (26.2)	−5.4 (22.3)	−8.3 (17.1)	−13.4 (7.9)
Average precipitation mm (inches)	177 (7.0)	134 (5.3)	133 (5.2)	109 (4.3)	107 (4.2)	95 (3.7)	120 (4.7)	106 (4.2)	140 (5.5)	177 (7.0)	175 (6.9)	178 (7.0)	1,651 (65.0)
Average extreme snow depth cm (inches)	1 (0.4)	1 (0.4)	0 (0)	0 (0)	0 (0)	0 (0)	0 (0)	0 (0)	0 (0)	0 (0)	0 (0)	0 (0)	1 (0.4)
Average rainy days	19	18	18	18	16	14	11	10	13	15	17	20	189
Average snowy days	6	6	3	0.3	0	0	0	0	0	0	1	4	20
Average relative humidity (%)	73	72	72	75	79	79	79	78	76	76	74	72	75
Mean monthly sunshine hours	96	105	145	161	221	258	279	281	226	195	121	86	2,174
Source 1: Pogoda.ru.net
Source 2: NOAA (sun, 1961–1990)

Climate data for Ulan-Ude (1991–2020 normals, extremes 1847–present)
Month	Jan	Feb	Mar	Apr	May	Jun	Jul	Aug	Sep	Oct	Nov	Dec	Year
Record high °C (°F)	−0.4 (31.3)	7.9 (46.2)	19.8 (67.6)	28.7 (83.7)	35.6 (96.1)	40.0 (104.0)	40.6 (105.1)	39.7 (103.5)	32.2 (90.0)	24.7 (76.5)	11.3 (52.3)	5.2 (41.4)	40.6 (105.1)
Mean daily maximum °C (°F)	−17.6 (0.3)	−10.6 (12.9)	0.4 (32.7)	10.7 (51.3)	18.6 (65.5)	25.5 (77.9)	27.5 (81.5)	24.2 (75.6)	16.8 (62.2)	6.9 (44.4)	−5.2 (22.6)	−14.8 (5.4)	6.9 (44.4)
Daily mean °C (°F)	−22.8 (−9.0)	−17.5 (0.5)	−6.7 (19.9)	3.4 (38.1)	10.9 (51.6)	17.9 (64.2)	20.6 (69.1)	17.7 (63.9)	10.0 (50.0)	0.8 (33.4)	−10.3 (13.5)	−19.4 (−2.9)	0.4 (32.7)
Mean daily minimum °C (°F)	−27.2 (−17.0)	−23.5 (−10.3)	−13.0 (8.6)	−3.0 (26.6)	3.8 (38.8)	11.1 (52.0)	14.6 (58.3)	12.3 (54.1)	4.6 (40.3)	−4.0 (24.8)	−14.4 (6.1)	−23.2 (−9.8)	−5.2 (22.6)
Record low °C (°F)	−54.4 (−65.9)	−44.9 (−48.8)	−40.4 (−40.7)	−28.0 (−18.4)	−15.1 (4.8)	−3.9 (25.0)	1.2 (34.2)	−4.0 (24.8)	−11.4 (11.5)	−27.9 (−18.2)	−38.0 (−36.4)	−48.8 (−55.8)	−54.4 (−65.9)
Average precipitation mm (inches)	5 (0.2)	3 (0.1)	3 (0.1)	6 (0.2)	18 (0.7)	34 (1.3)	64 (2.5)	63 (2.5)	27 (1.1)	7 (0.3)	9 (0.4)	11 (0.4)	250 (9.8)
Average extreme snow depth cm (inches)	12 (4.7)	12 (4.7)	4 (1.6)	0 (0)	0 (0)	0 (0)	0 (0)	0 (0)	0 (0)	0 (0)	3 (1.2)	9 (3.5)	12 (4.7)
Average rainy days	0	0.04	1	6	10	14	16	15	13	7	1	0	83
Average snowy days	15	11	9	8	2	0.03	0	0	1	8	17	18	89
Average relative humidity (%)	77	75	66	53	49	57	64	69	68	68	76	78	67
Mean monthly sunshine hours	115	155	225	248	287	288	270	247	211	167	113	92	2,418
Source 1: Погода и Климат
Source 2: NOAA (sun, 1961-1990)

Climate data for Vladivostok (1991–2020 normals, extremes 1872–present)
Month	Jan	Feb	Mar	Apr	May	Jun	Jul	Aug	Sep	Oct	Nov	Dec	Year
Record high °C (°F)	5.0 (41.0)	9.9 (49.8)	19.4 (66.9)	27.7 (81.9)	29.5 (85.1)	31.8 (89.2)	33.6 (92.5)	32.6 (90.7)	30.0 (86.0)	23.7 (74.7)	17.5 (63.5)	9.4 (48.9)	33.6 (92.5)
Mean daily maximum °C (°F)	−7.8 (18.0)	−3.8 (25.2)	2.7 (36.9)	10.1 (50.2)	14.9 (58.8)	17.9 (64.2)	21.6 (70.9)	23.3 (73.9)	20.1 (68.2)	13.2 (55.8)	3.3 (37.9)	−5.4 (22.3)	9.2 (48.6)
Daily mean °C (°F)	−11.9 (10.6)	−8.1 (17.4)	−1.5 (29.3)	5.3 (41.5)	10.0 (50.0)	13.8 (56.8)	18.1 (64.6)	20.0 (68.0)	16.3 (61.3)	9.2 (48.6)	−0.7 (30.7)	−9.2 (15.4)	5.1 (41.2)
Mean daily minimum °C (°F)	−15.0 (5.0)	−11.3 (11.7)	−4.5 (23.9)	2.1 (35.8)	7.0 (44.6)	11.3 (52.3)	16.1 (61.0)	17.9 (64.2)	13.5 (56.3)	6.2 (43.2)	−3.5 (25.7)	−12.0 (10.4)	2.3 (36.1)
Record low °C (°F)	−31.4 (−24.5)	−28.9 (−20.0)	−21.3 (−6.3)	−7.8 (18.0)	−0.8 (30.6)	3.7 (38.7)	8.7 (47.7)	10.1 (50.2)	1.3 (34.3)	−9.7 (14.5)	−20.0 (−4.0)	−28.1 (−18.6)	−31.4 (−24.5)
Average precipitation mm (inches)	12 (0.5)	16 (0.6)	27 (1.1)	43 (1.7)	97 (3.8)	105 (4.1)	159 (6.3)	176 (6.9)	103 (4.1)	67 (2.6)	36 (1.4)	19 (0.7)	860 (33.9)
Average extreme snow depth cm (inches)	5 (2.0)	4 (1.6)	3 (1.2)	0 (0)	0 (0)	0 (0)	0 (0)	0 (0)	0 (0)	0 (0)	1 (0.4)	3 (1.2)	5 (2.0)
Average rainy days	0.3	0.3	4	13	20	22	22	19	14	12	5	1	133
Average snowy days	7	8	11	4	0.3	0	0	0	0	1	7	9	47
Average relative humidity (%)	58	57	60	67	76	87	92	87	77	65	60	60	71
Mean monthly sunshine hours	178.2	180.8	209.6	182.3	170.3	131.1	120.3	150.2	198.0	194.6	160.0	150.3	2,025.7
Source 1: Погода и Климат
Source 2: NOAA

Sea temperature data for Vladivostok
Month	Jan	Feb	Mar	Apr	May	Jun	Jul	Aug	Sep	Oct	Nov	Dec	Year
Average sea temperature °C (°F)	−1.2 (29.8)	−1.6 (29.1)	−0.9 (30.4)	2.6 (36.7)	8.8 (47.8)	14.2 (57.6)	19.4 (66.9)	22.4 (72.3)	19.4 (66.9)	13.7 (56.7)	6.2 (43.2)	0.7 (33.3)	8.64 (47.6)

Climate data for Yakutsk/Jakutsk weather station (WMO identifier: 24959), 98.3m amsl, 1991−2020 normals, extremes 1829–present
Month	Jan	Feb	Mar	Apr	May	Jun	Jul	Aug	Sep	Oct	Nov	Dec	Year
Record high °C (°F)	−5.8 (21.6)	−2.2 (28.0)	8.3 (46.9)	21.1 (70.0)	31.1 (88.0)	35.4 (95.7)	38.4 (101.1)	35.4 (95.7)	27.0 (80.6)	20.5 (68.9)	3.9 (39.0)	−3.9 (25.0)	38.4 (101.1)
Mean daily maximum °C (°F)	−34.0 (−29.2)	−27.9 (−18.2)	−11.6 (11.1)	2.6 (36.7)	13.8 (56.8)	23.1 (73.6)	25.8 (78.4)	21.8 (71.2)	11.9 (53.4)	−3.0 (26.6)	−22.3 (−8.1)	−34.4 (−29.9)	−2.8 (27.0)
Daily mean °C (°F)	−36.9 (−34.4)	−32.9 (−27.2)	−19.1 (−2.4)	−3.7 (25.3)	8.0 (46.4)	17.0 (62.6)	19.9 (67.8)	15.6 (60.1)	6.4 (43.5)	−6.9 (19.6)	−25.9 (−14.6)	−37.0 (−34.6)	−8.0 (17.6)
Mean daily minimum °C (°F)	−39.8 (−39.6)	−37.2 (−35.0)	−26.0 (−14.8)	−10.4 (13.3)	1.5 (34.7)	9.8 (49.6)	13.1 (55.6)	9.3 (48.7)	1.3 (34.3)	−11.0 (12.2)	−29.6 (−21.3)	−39.5 (−39.1)	−13.2 (8.2)
Record low °C (°F)	−63.0 (−81.4)	−64.4 (−83.9)	−54.9 (−66.8)	−41.0 (−41.8)	−18.1 (−0.6)	−5.4 (22.3)	−1.5 (29.3)	−7.8 (18.0)	−14.2 (6.4)	−40.9 (−41.6)	−54.5 (−66.1)	−59.8 (−75.6)	−64.4 (−83.9)
Average precipitation mm (inches)	10 (0.4)	9 (0.4)	6 (0.2)	8 (0.3)	20 (0.8)	30 (1.2)	40 (1.6)	37 (1.5)	30 (1.2)	19 (0.7)	17 (0.7)	9 (0.4)	235 (9.3)
Average extreme snow depth cm (inches)	27 (11)	31 (12)	33 (13)	21 (8.3)	0 (0)	0 (0)	0 (0)	0 (0)	0 (0)	4 (1.6)	15 (5.9)	22 (8.7)	33 (13)
Average rainy days	0	0	0.2	3	13	14	14	14	14	3	0.1	0	75
Average snowy days	26	24	16	9	3	0.2	0.03	0.1	3	24	27	25	157
Average relative humidity (%)	76	76	70	59	53	56	62	68	71	78	78	75	69
Mean monthly sunshine hours	20.7	102.6	252.8	296.8	288.2	334.8	334.0	262.9	170.1	96.3	66.9	11.5	2,251.1
Source 1: Погода и Климат
Source 2: NOAA

== See also ==
- Climate change in Russia
- Rasputitsa
- Tropical cyclones in Russia
