= Typhoon Halong (2025) =

Pacific typhoon in 2025

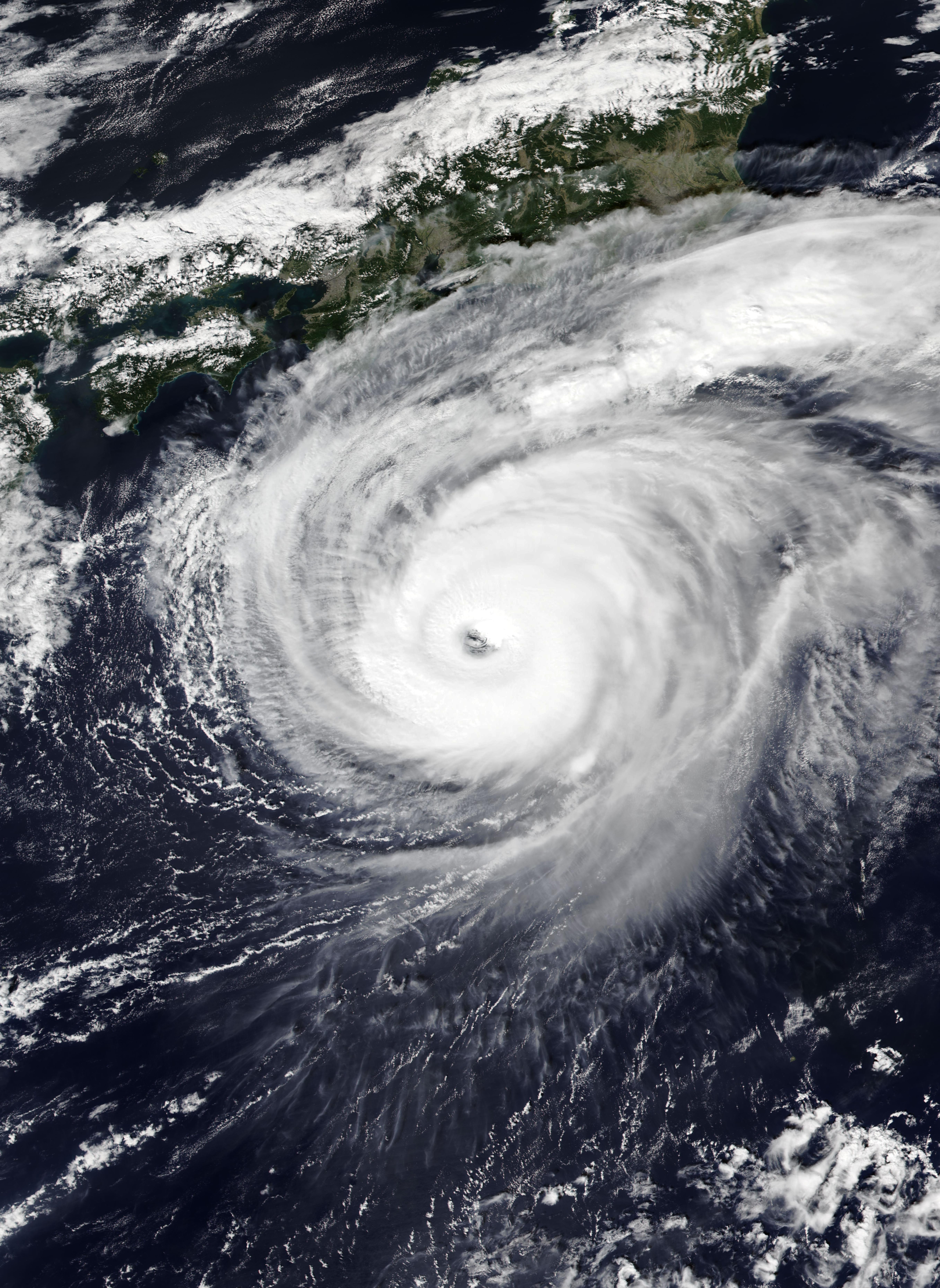
- Halong at peak intensity south of Japan on October 8

Meteorological history
- Formed: October 3, 2025
- Extratropical: October 10, 2025
- Dissipated: October 13, 2025

Very strong typhoon
- 10-minute sustained (JMA)
- Highest winds: 185 km/h (115 mph)
- Lowest pressure: 935 hPa (mbar); 27.61 inHg

Category 4-equivalent typhoon
- 1-minute sustained (SSHWS/JTWC)
- Highest winds: 230 km/h (145 mph)
- Lowest pressure: 931 hPa (mbar); 27.49 inHg

Overall effects
- Fatalities: 3
- Missing: 1
- Damage: ≥$125 million (2025 USD)
- Areas affected: Japan; Alaska
- Part of the 2025 Pacific typhoon season and 2025–26 North American winter

Typhoon Halong (Note: The name Halong (Vietnamese: Hạ Long, [haː˧˨ʔ lawŋ͡m˧˧]) was contributed by Vietnam and refers to Hạ Long Bay in Vietnamese.) was a powerful tropical cyclone that affected Japan before affecting western Alaska as an extratropical cyclone in early October 2025. The twenty-second named storm and the ninth typhoon of the 2025 Pacific typhoon season, Halong formed from a broad area of convection south of Iwo Jima on October 4. Located in a favorable environment, the storm strengthened to a severe tropical storm on October 5 and a typhoon on October 6 as an eye began to develop. That same day, Halong rapidly intensified into a very strong typhoon (Category 4 on the Saffir–Simpson scale), developing a defined, clear eye. It passed near Japan near peak intensity before turning northeast, gradually weakening due to increasing wind shear and transitioned into an extratropical cyclone on October 10. The remnants of the storm later went on to affect the Aleutian Islands, before eventually weakening and dissipating by October 13.

Halong generated strong waves that left one person dead in Japan. In Hachijojima, wind speeds were measured at 107 knots (123 mph) and record rainfall amounts of 349 millimetres (13.7 in) were observed. Over 2,700 customers lost water on the island and another 2,200 customers lost power. Several roads were left impassible on these islands due to flooding and downed trees. In Western Alaska, flood and high wind watches were issued as the extratropical remnants of Halong approached, bringing hurricane-force winds to the Bering Sea. The storm caused widespread damage in the Yukon-Kuskokwim Delta, where winds reached 107 miles per hour (172 km/h) in the Kusilvak Mountains. Record flooding hit Kipnuk and Kwigillingok, where homes were swept away and several residents went missing. One fatality was confirmed in Kwigillingok, with two others missing. One of the missing persons was found over 8 months later, bringing the confirmed fatalities to 2 in Alaska.

== Meteorological history ==
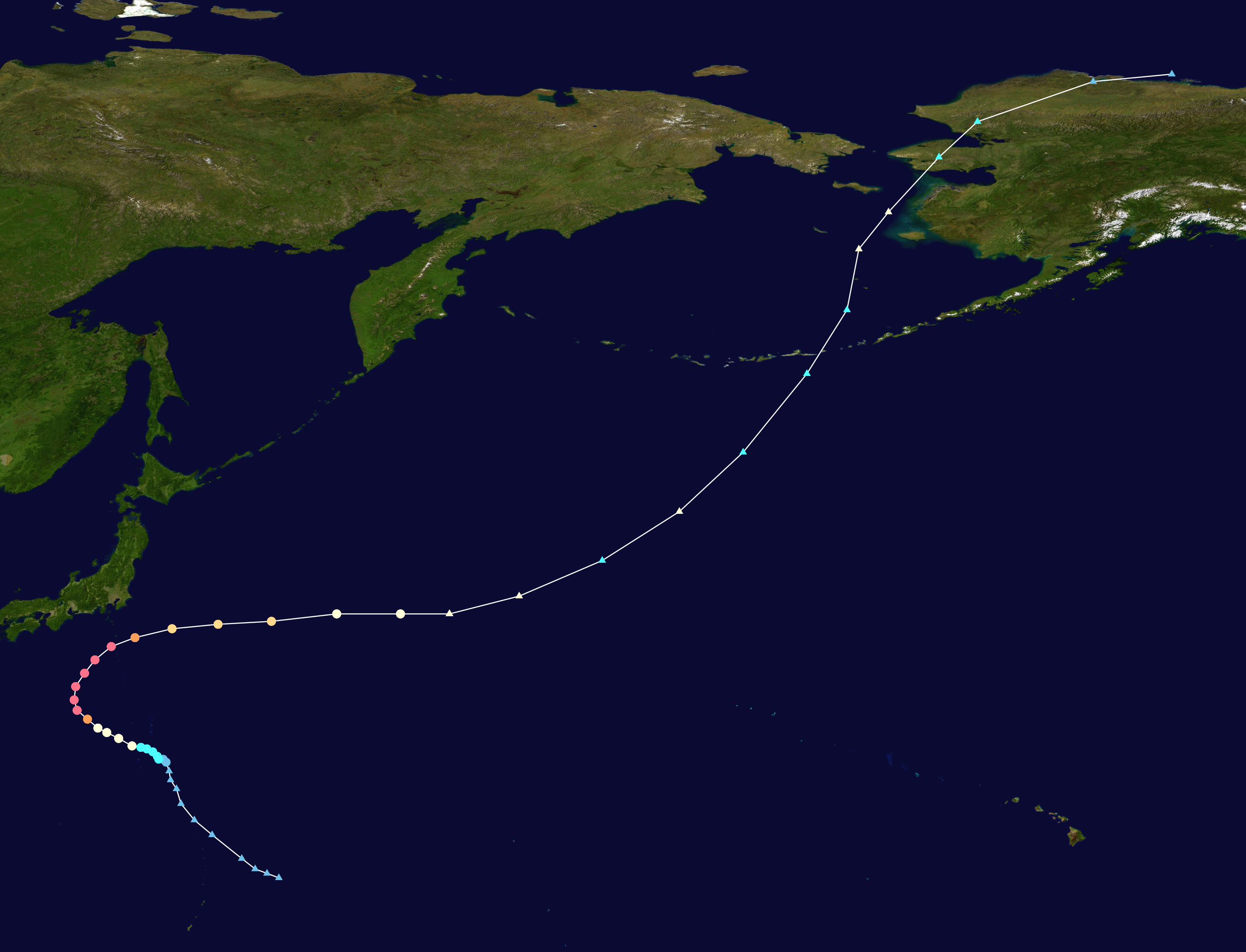
Map plotting the storm's track and intensity, according to the Saffir–Simpson scale Map key Saffir–Simpson scale Tropical depression (≤38 mph, ≤62 km/h) Tropical storm (39–73 mph, 63–118 km/h) Category 1 (74–95 mph, 119–153 km/h) Category 2 (96–110 mph, 154–177 km/h) Category 3 (111–129 mph, 178–208 km/h) Category 4 (130–156 mph, 209–251 km/h) Category 5 (≥157 mph, ≥252 km/h) Unknown Storm type Tropical cyclone Subtropical cyclone Extratropical cyclone, remnant low, tropical disturbance, or monsoon depression

On October 3, a broad area of convection developed about 264 nautical miles (489 km; 304 mi) southeast of Iwo Jima, Japan, with flaring convection along its eastern periphery but no discernible low-level circulation center (LLCC). At that time, the system was situated in a marginally favorable environment, characterized by low to moderate wind shear of 15–20 knots (28–37 km/h; 17–23 mph), warm sea surface temperatures of 28–29 °C (82–84 °F), and moderate outflow aloft. The Japan Meteorological Agency (JMA) (Note: The JMA is the Regional Specialized Meteorological Centre (RSMC) for the Western North Pacific.) began monitoring the system the following day, classifying it as a tropical depression and locating it at 24.8°N 143.9°E. Its LLCC later became obscured, caused by persistent convection located directly over the center. The Joint Typhoon Warning Center (JTWC) later issued a Tropical Cyclone Formation Alert (TCFA) at 06:00 UTC, citing a high chance of development. The JTWC subsequently followed suit nine hours later at 15:00 UTC and designated the depression as 28W. The depression intensified into a tropical storm early on October 5 and was named Halong by the JMA.

Halong later intensified into a severe tropical storm by the JMA, whilst JTWC further upgraded it into a minimal typhoon on the following day as it slowly tracks northwestwards, with a developing eye and defined cirrus filaments extending poleward. That day, it underwent rapid intensification as a well-defined eye developed, with the JTWC assessing its peak as a Category 4-equivalent typhoon, with winds of 225 km/h (140 mph). Halong tracked northeastward on October 8, maintaining intensity despite a less symmetrical eye. It began weakening the next day due to 25–30 knots (46–56 km/h; 29–35 mph) wind shear and dry air. JTWC issued its final advisory on October 10 as Halong transitioned into an extratropical cyclone. The JMA continued monitoring it until declaring it extratropical at 22:10 JST (13:10 UTC). Halong moved northward over the next day and was located just south of the Aleutian Islands on October 11. The cyclone then moved into the southern Bering Sea that afternoon, and then moved north along the western coast of Alaska on October 12. It made landfall near Buckland later that day. On October 13, Halong entered the Arctic Ocean near Banks Island and began rapidly weakening. The remnants of the storm dissipated later that day.

== Preparations ==
In Western Alaska, flood and high wind watches were issued ahead of the storm's expected intensification as an extratropical storm in the North Pacific and Bering Sea, where winds up to hurricane force were expected. However, the forecasted track was not finalized until 36 hours before landfall, which is not enough time for evacuations for most communities in the region.

Kotzebue city officials declared the town's school gym as a shelter starting on October 7. Expecting a storm surge, also on 7 October, it was announced that the school would be cancelled for the next day. In Hooper Bay, the school released students early on that same day.

A mandatory evacuation order was announced in the city of Kotzebue on October 8 with residents asked to shelter in the school gym beginning at 6 pm. All non-essential services remained closed.

== Impact ==
=== Japan ===
Halong generated strong waves that left one person dead in Japan. On the island of Hachijō-jima, wind speeds were measured at 107 knots (198 km/h; 123 mph) and record rainfall amounts of 349 millimetres (13.7 in) were observed. Over 2,700 customers lost water on the island and another 2,200 customers lost power. About 20 customers also lost power on Aogashima. Several roads were left impassible on these islands due to flooding and downed trees.

=== Alaska ===
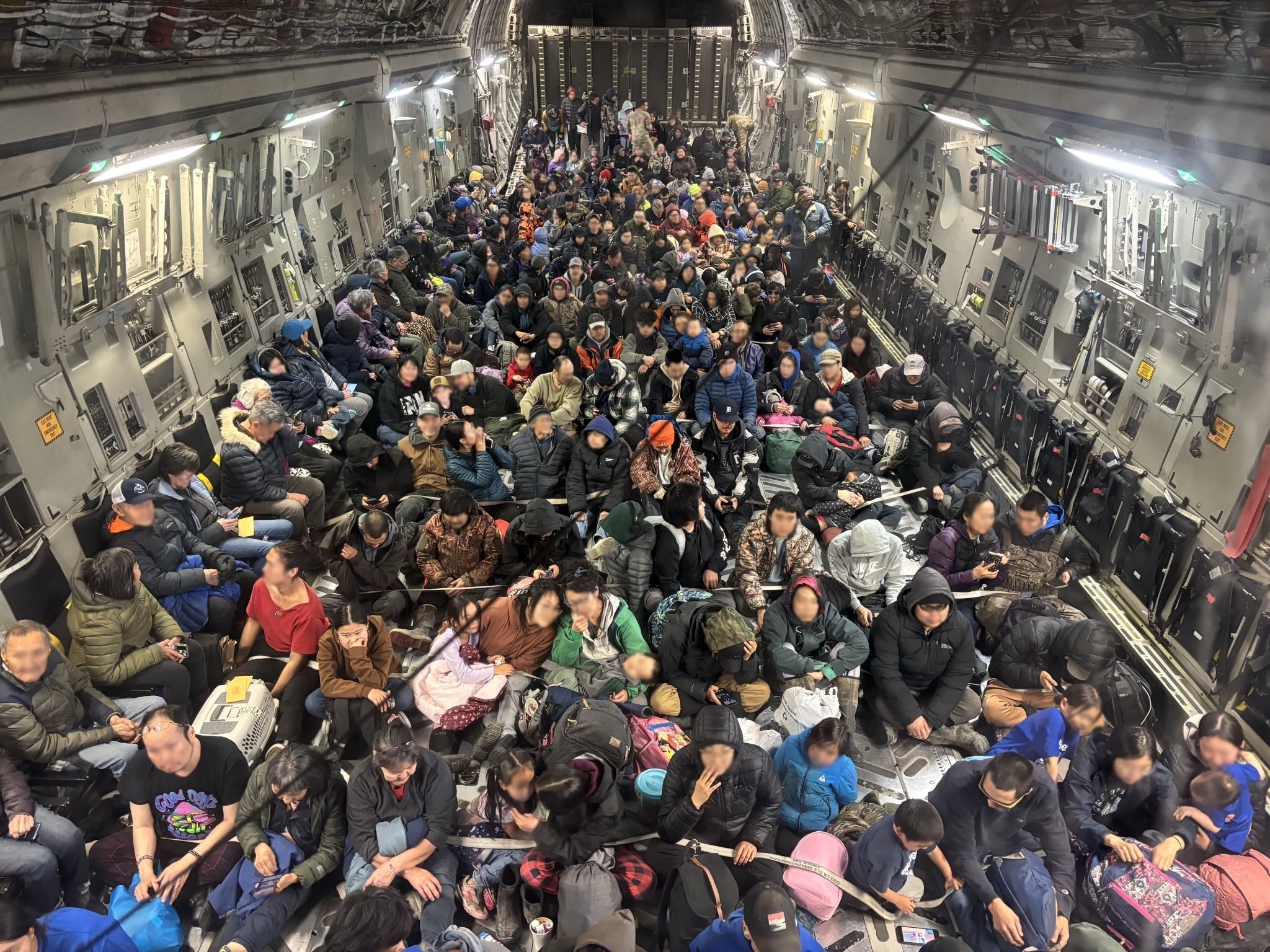
Residents being evacuated from Bethel by the Alaska Air National Guard

In Western Alaska, flood and high wind watches were issued ahead of the storm's expected intensification as an extratropical storm in the North Pacific and Bering Sea, where winds up to hurricane force were expected. These were later upgraded to warnings, with comparisons made to Ex-Typhoon Merbok in 2022, which caused severe flooding in some coastal communities in September of that year.

The remnants of Halong brought significant impacts to Alaska, with the worst of the impact in the Yukon–Kuskokwim Delta. Wind speeds of 98 knots (181 km/h; 113 mph) were measured in the Kusilvak Mountains. The storm caused record flooding in Kipnuk and Kwigillingok where several people went missing after numerous houses were floated off their foundations. The Coast Guard rescued approximately 20 persons from their homes after the buildings had floated out to sea. A roof detached from a home and a school boardwalk was damaged in Kongiganak. Near Quinhagak, the Nunalleq archaeological digsite was destroyed by the flooding, and artifacts from the permafrost was dispersed.

Water levels in Kipnuk reached record heights of 6.6 feet (2.0 m) above mean high water. Boardwalks and roads were submerged across the Yukon-Kuskokwim region, while debris blocked the runway at Bethel Airport and a barge in Bethel broke from its mooring and struck a bridge. Elsewhere in Western Alaska, strong winds occurred, resulting in roof and siding damage, airborne debris, and extensive tree damage. Several power outages occurred, including to the KSKO radio station in McGrath which was knocked off the air.

In response to impacts from the storm, parts of western Alaska were placed under a disaster declaration by Governor Mike Dunleavy. On October 13 after the storm, Alaska State Troopers confirmed there was one fatality in Kwigillingok, with two others missing; they confirmed that all were accounted for from Kipnuk. They also said a search helicopter from Fairbanks was sent to the area to deliver generators and fuel, with additional search and rescue efforts conducted jointly by the U.S. Coast Guard, Alaska Army National Guard, and Alaska Air National Guard. One of the missing persons from Kwigillingok was found in June, 8 months after the storm. As of June 2026, one person remains missing.

In Alaska, the storm resulted in one woman dead along with thousands displaced. Governor Dunleavy, in his request for a federal disaster declaration on October 16, said that many residents "will not be able to return to their communities for more than 18 months". The Red Cross asked for the OpenStreetMap to help map the villages that were damaged by the storm as they begin operating in the area. A FEMA assessment estimated the storm to have caused $125 million dollars in damages.

== Aftermath ==
In addition to the fatalities, over 51 people required rescue after the storm, with over 1,600 people displaced. As of November 2025, there are about 1,000 people displaced in Bethel and Anchorage, with the rest in hotels or other temporary housing.

A thousand emergency meals were also distributed along the coast. On October 22, President Donald Trump approved Alaska's disaster declaration. As part of the approval of the disaster declaration, the federal government would pay for all the disaster-related expenses for 90 days.

According to the Alaska Village Council Presidents, 52 communities have reported damage, with around a dozen reporting significant damage. The state Department of Homeland Security reported 208 homes were totally destroyed, 471 sustained major damage, 389 sustained minor damage, and 1,000 were affected.

== See also ==
- Weather of 2025
- Tropical cyclones in 2025
- Other storms of the same name
- List of Alaska tropical cyclones
