= List of Alaska tropical cyclones =

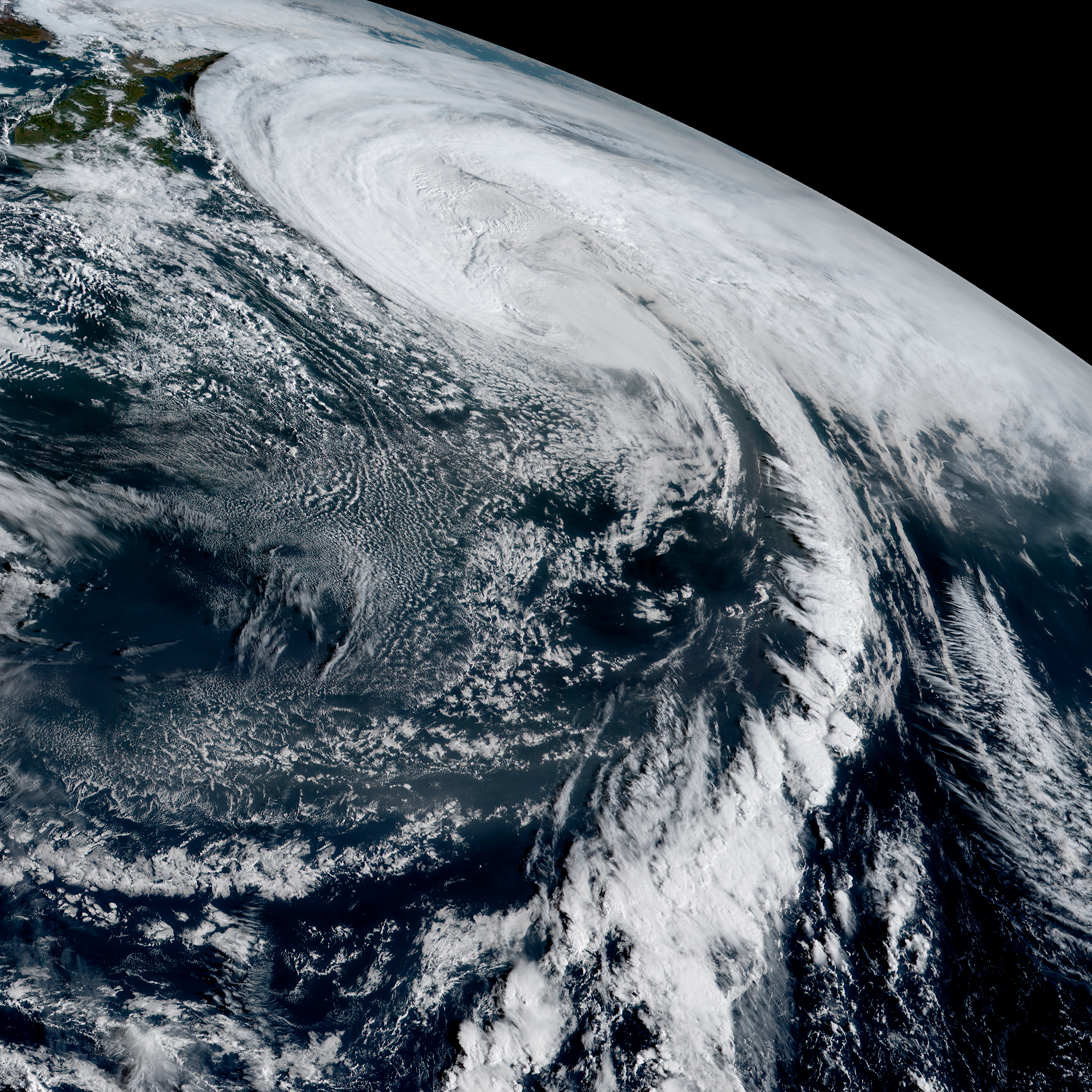
The extratropical remnants of Typhoon Merbok over the Bering Sea in September 2022

The U.S. state of Alaska has been affected by several tropical cyclones. Due to the state's high northern latitude, tropical cyclones influence Alaska as remnant extratropical cyclones and their impacts are mostly limited to heavy rain, strong winds, and localized flooding. Most tropical cyclones that impact Alaska originate from typhoons that form in the Northwest Pacific Ocean. Several significant typhoon remnants have impacted Alaska. In 1967, the remnants of Tropical Storm Hope contributed to the worst flooding in the history of Fairbanks. The remnants of Typhoon Merbok in 2022 became the most intense storm to impact Western Alaska in the month of September in over 70 years. In 2025, the remnants of Typhoon Halong caused several fatalities and brought record-breaking flooding to several coastal villages.

== Climatology and effects ==
Alaska is a large landmass on the North American continent and the northernmost state of the United States, reaching into the Arctic Circle. It is surrounded by the Arctic Ocean to the north, Bering Sea to the west, the Pacific Ocean and Gulf of Alaska to the south, and Canada to the east. The extratropical remnants of Pacific typhoons are known to impact Alaska, primarily in the summer and fall months. Decreasing sea surface temperatures in the far Northern Pacific Ocean necessary for continued tropical cyclogenesis cause tropical cyclones to weaken as they move poleward. Approximately 50% of typhoons undergo an extratropical transition, characterized by the decrease in core convection as the storm moves over waters less than 79 °F (26 °C). During the extratropical transition, a low-pressure trough may influence the storm to undergo explosive cyclogenesis. The low-pressure Aleutian Low, located over the Aleutian Islands, and high-pressure North Pacific High, located to the south of Alaska, can steer cyclones over Alaska and cause intensification of storms. Since 1970, more than 60 ex-typhoons have made landfall in the state, with most hitting the Western coast.

The remnants of tropical cyclones are capable of increasing the intensity of already existing storms in the state. In the past, extratropical cyclones have brought heavy rains, strong winds, and flooding to portions of Alaska. In coastal areas, storm surge has also been observed. In low-lying areas near river deltas, the effects of tropical cyclones can be amplified due to the flatness of the terrain. Native Alaskan communities, often located in isolated parts of the state, are disproportionately impacted by tropical cyclone remnants. The lack of road transportation, hazardous weather, and distance from other population centers make recovery efforts more difficult in such communities. Due the impacts of climate change and the effects it has on northern regions, tropical cyclone remnants are predicted to be more intense and their effects may become more severe.

== List of storms ==
- August 12–20, 1967: An extratropical cyclone in the Bering Sea related to the remnants of Tropical Storm Hope resulted in increased moisture influx over Central Alaska, which contributed to devastating floods in Fairbanks. The peak discharge floods exceeded 74,000 cu ft/s (2,100 m^{3}/s) in the Chena River. Total damage exceeded $85 million (1967 USD) and six people were killed.
- September 5, 1975: An unnamed hurricane became an extratropical cyclone in the Gulf of Alaska, with the remnants moving inland over British Columbia.
- October 25, 1977: Tropical Storm Harriet (Saling) passed north into the Bering Sea and broke the then-record for most powerful storm in the north Pacific at 926 mb. Two homes were blown off of their foundations in Atka, while Adak experienced a 12-hour period of 110 mph or greater gusts.
- July 31, 1978: The remnants of Hurricane Fico, embedded into a cold front, caused ships to the southeast of Cold Bay to experience heavy rains and 45 mph (72 km/h) winds.
- September 30, 1991: The remnants of Typhoon Mireille passed over the Aleutian Islands. Wind gusts of up to 70 mph (110 km/h) were observed in Amchitka.
- December 9, 1991: The extratropical remnants of Tropical Storm Zelda brought high winds and precipitation across Alaska. In Cold Bay, gusts increased to 45 mph (72 km/h). Bethel and the Pribilof Islands received heavy snow and low visibility. Southcentral Alaska experienced light snowfall and the places in the Alaskan Panhandle received two inches of rain.
- September 10, 1994: The remnants of Hurricane John passed over Dutch Harbor. The storm brought high temperatures reaching 66 °F (19 °C) and wind gusts of 46 mph (74 km/h).
- October 2004: The remnants of Typhoon Ma-on reached a minimum pressure of 941 mb, brought high storm surges to the Alaskan coast.

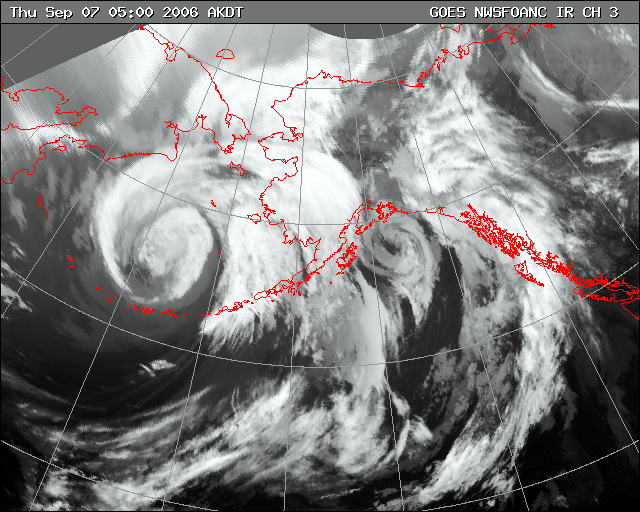
The remnants of Hurricane Ioke over the Bering Sea on September 7

- September 8–12, 2006: Hurricane Ioke entered the Bering Sea as an extratropical cyclone. In the Aleutian Islands, gusts exceeding 80 mph (130 km/h) were observed in Unalaska and Adak. Wave heights off the coast of the islands reached above 30 ft (9.1 m). On the Alaskan mainland, Ioke caused flooding and heavy rainfall, especially in coastal areas. Bethel received 1.15 in (2.9 cm) of rain. Ioke caused flooding along Bristol Bay and the Yukon–Kuskokwim Delta. The storm caused total of $113,000 (2015 USD) in damage.
- September 2006: The passage of ex-typhoons Shanshan and Yagi resulted in significant rain and winds across Alaska.
- October 12–13, 2014: A low-pressure system associated with the remnants of Typhoon Phanfone caused strong gusts of up to 74 mph (119 km/h) at King Cove.
- November 8, 2014: The extratropical remnants of Typhoon Nuri got absorbed into another extratropical cyclone in the Bering Sea. The interaction between the two systems caused the new system to be the most intense extratropical cyclone over the Bering Sea, with an estimated pressure of 924 mbar (27.3 inHg) by the Ocean Prediction Center. (Note: The Japan Meteorological Agency estimated a pressure of 920 mbar (27 inHg).) Winds of up to 96 mph (154 km/h) were recorded at Eareckson Air Station on Shemya. Only minimal damage was recorded at the station, and there were no reports of injuries or other damage from the storm.
- October 10, 2015: The gale-force remnants of Hurricane Oho moved inland near Ice Bay. Upwards of 7 in (18 cm) of rain were observed in Ketchikan. Wind speeds of 50 mph (80 km/h) occurred in Sitka, with gusts reaching 62 mph (100 km/h).
- August 12, 2018: The remnants of Typhoon Shanshan resulted in strong winds and heavy rainfall across Southcentral Alaska. In Anchorage, 150 homes lost power following strong winds. Gusts of 75 mph (121 km/h) were measured in McHugh Creek.
- September 15–18, 2022: The remnants of Typhoon Merbok became the strongest extratropical cyclone to impact Western Alaska in September in over 70 years. Merbok resulted in wave heights of over 50 ft (15 m) in the Bering Sea. Hurricane-force winds and widespread flooding were observed along the Alaskan coastline. Forty primarily Alaskan Native communities were impacted by the storm. In Shaktoolik, the seawall berm protecting the village from ocean waves was destroyed. In Nome, streets were flooded and at least one home was swept off its foundation. Multiple homes detached from their foundations amid flooding in Golovin and Newtok. The water levels in the town reached 10.3 ft (3.1 m), the highest since 1974. Despite the destruction, no injuries or deaths were reported.
- October 17, 2023: Typhoon Bolaven brought heavy rainfall to Southeast Alaska. Ketchikan received 6.69 in (17.0 cm) of rain on October 17, a record for that day in the town.
- August 21, 2024: The remnants of Typhoon Ampil passed over the Russian Far East and Northern Alaska. Areas in Western Alaska received strong winds and high coastal waves.

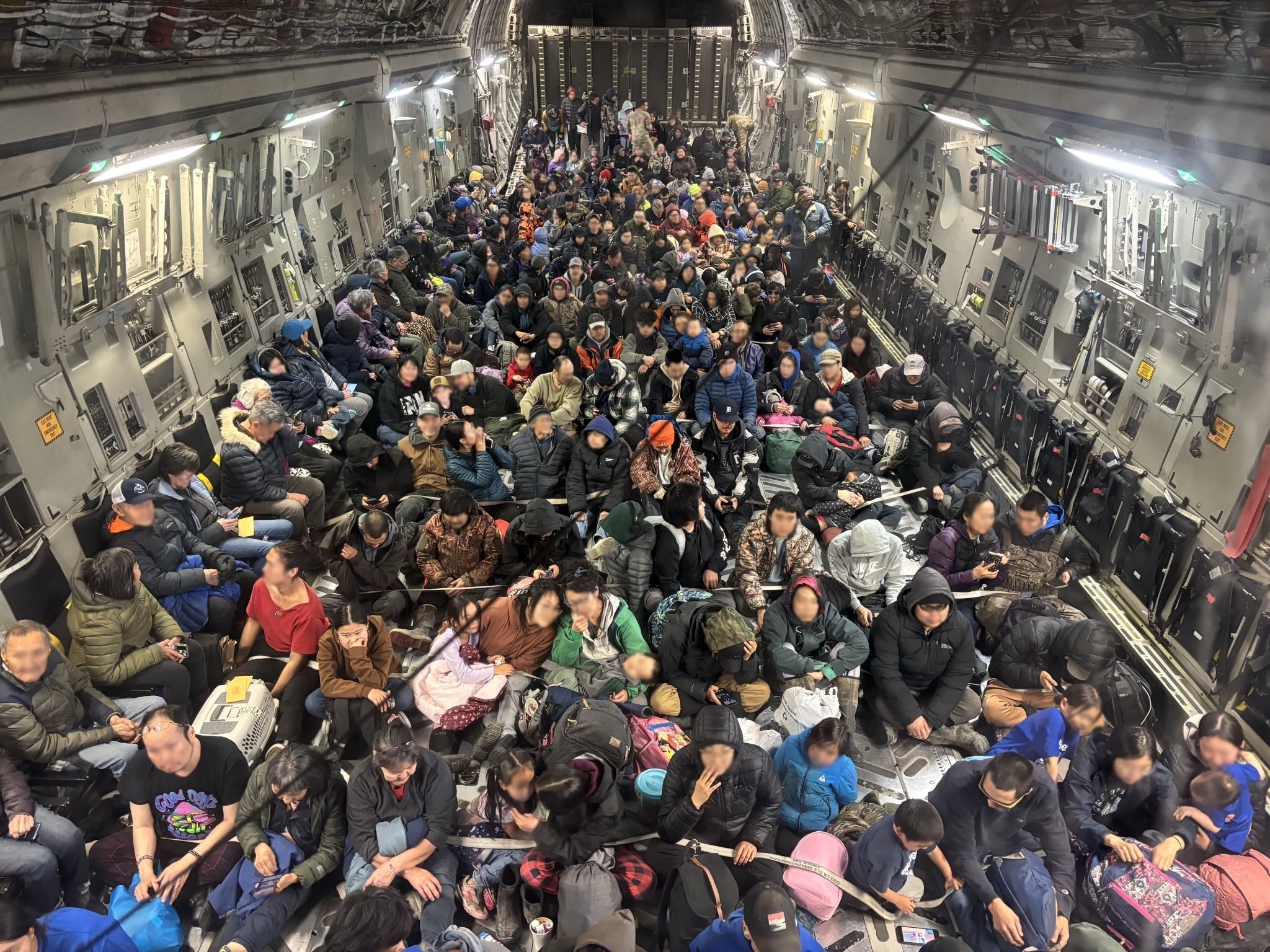
Displaced residents of Bethel, Alaska, being evacuated following Typhoon Halong by the Alaska Air National Guard

- October 11–13, 2025: Typhoon Halong impacted Western Alaska as a powerful extratropical cyclone. Strong storm surge flooded communities up the Yukon–Kuskokwim Delta up to 60 mi (97 km) inland. Flood and hurricane-force were observed along the coast. Forty-nine communities were impacted by the storm, with the most severe impacts being in Kipnuk and Kwigillingok. In Kipnuk, 121 houses were destroyed as the water height reached 6 ft (1.8 m) above normal levels. In Kwigillingok, the United States Coast Guard rescued twenty-four people that were inside homes being swept away by floodwaters. By the end of October, one person was killed and two others were reported missing. One of the missing was found 8 months later, bringing the total to 2 killed in Alaska and, as of June 2026, one more remains missing.

=== Other tropical-like systems ===
- March 7–9, 1977: A cyclone developed over the Western Bering Sea and began moving westward. The center of the storm passed over St. Paul Island, where a weather station measured a pressure of 970 mbar (29 inHg). The storm continued eastward until it made landfall at Cape Newenham on March 9 with winds in excess of 67 mph (108 km/h) and dissipated shortly after. Throughout the storm's life, it exhibited an eye, an unusually symmetrical cloud banding, and a thermodynamic structure similar to a tropical cyclone.

== See also ==
- Climate of Alaska
- List of United States hurricanes
- Tropical cyclones in Russia
