= Typhoon Bolaven (2023) =

Pacific typhoon in 2023

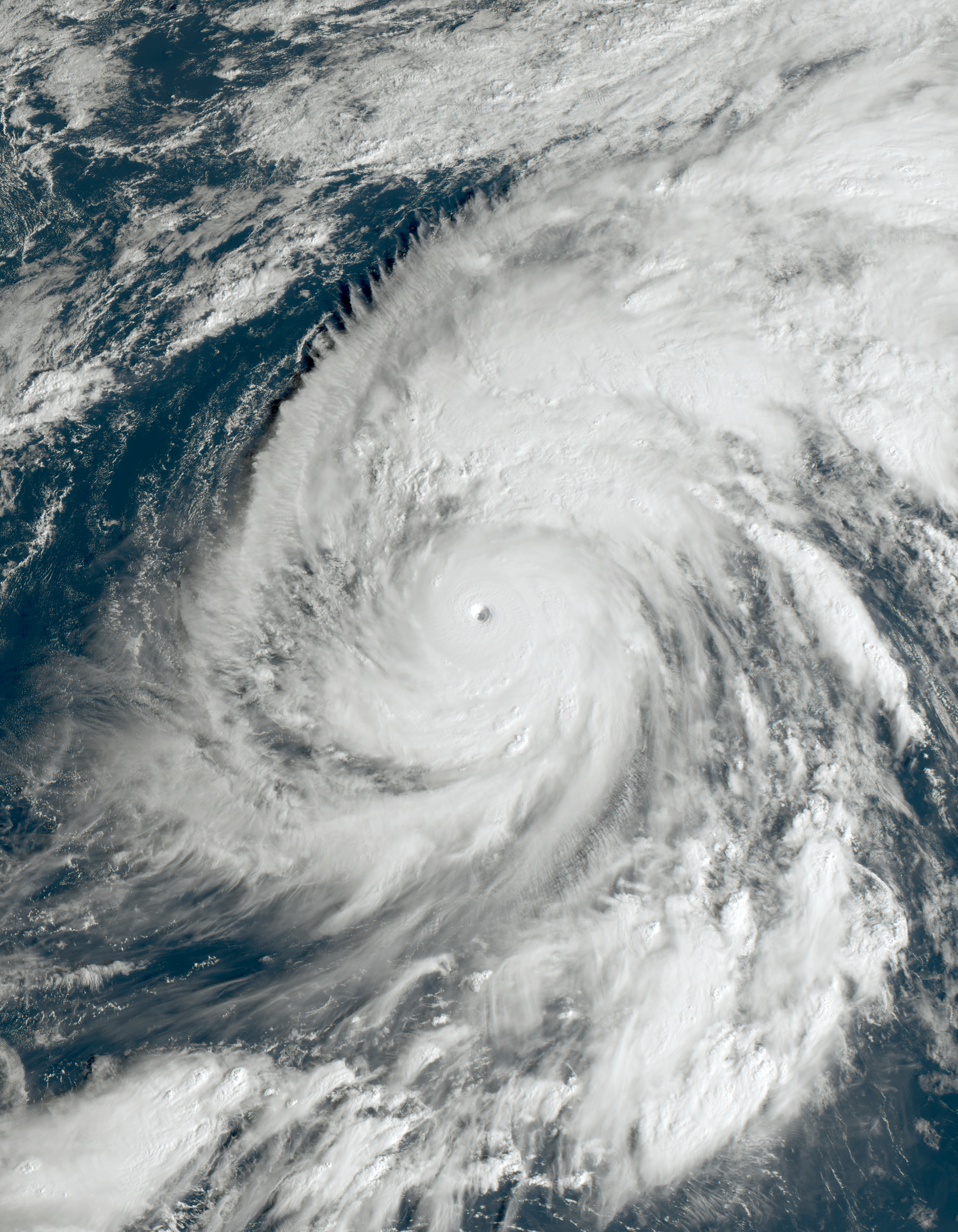
- Bolaven near peak intensity while over the open Pacific Ocean on October 11

Meteorological history
- Formed: October 6, 2023
- Extratropical: October 14, 2023
- Dissipated: October 19, 2023

Violent typhoon
- 10-minute sustained (JMA)
- Highest winds: 215 km/h (130 mph)
- Lowest pressure: 905 hPa (mbar); 26.72 inHg

Category 5-equivalent super typhoon
- 1-minute sustained (SSHWS/JTWC)
- Highest winds: 305 km/h (190 mph)
- Lowest pressure: 897 hPa (mbar); 26.49 inHg

Overall effects
- Casualties: None
- Damage: Minimal
- Areas affected: Federated States of Micronesia; Guam; Northern Mariana Islands; Bonin Islands; Alaska
- Part of the 2023 Pacific typhoon season

Typhoon Bolaven (Note: The name Bolaven (Lao: ບໍລະເວນ, [bɔː˩ la˧ ʋeːn˦˥]) was contributed by Laos and refers to Bolaven Plateau in Lao.) was an extremely powerful tropical cyclone that minimally impacted the Northern Mariana Islands in mid-October 2023. The fifteenth named storm of the 2023 Pacific typhoon season, Bolaven originated as a tropical depression on October 6 near the Federated States of Micronesia (FSM) and moved to the northwest. The system soon intensified into a tropical storm the following day. After a period of little to no organization, Bolaven strengthened into a typhoon as it passed through the Northern Mariana Islands on October 10. Extremely favorable conditions then led to Bolaven undergoing explosive intensification, quickly becoming a super typhoon shortly thereafter. The powerful cyclone then reached its peak intensity with a minimum central pressure of 905 mb (26.7 inHg) on October 11, eventually turning to the northeast in response to an approaching trough. Bolaven remained a super typhoon until October 13, at which point increasingly hostile conditions led to rapid weakening of the typhoon as it began extratropical transition, completing the process the following day. The remnants of Bolaven traversed the Northern Pacific Ocean until moving ashore in Canada on October 19, dissipating afterwards.

Bolaven impacted Micronesia and the Northern Mariana Islands, bringing scattered floods and downing trees as it passed through. After being absorbed by another weather system, its remnant energy brought wind and rain to areas in Alaska and British Columbia. No casualties were reported, but some minimal damage was reported.

== Meteorological history ==
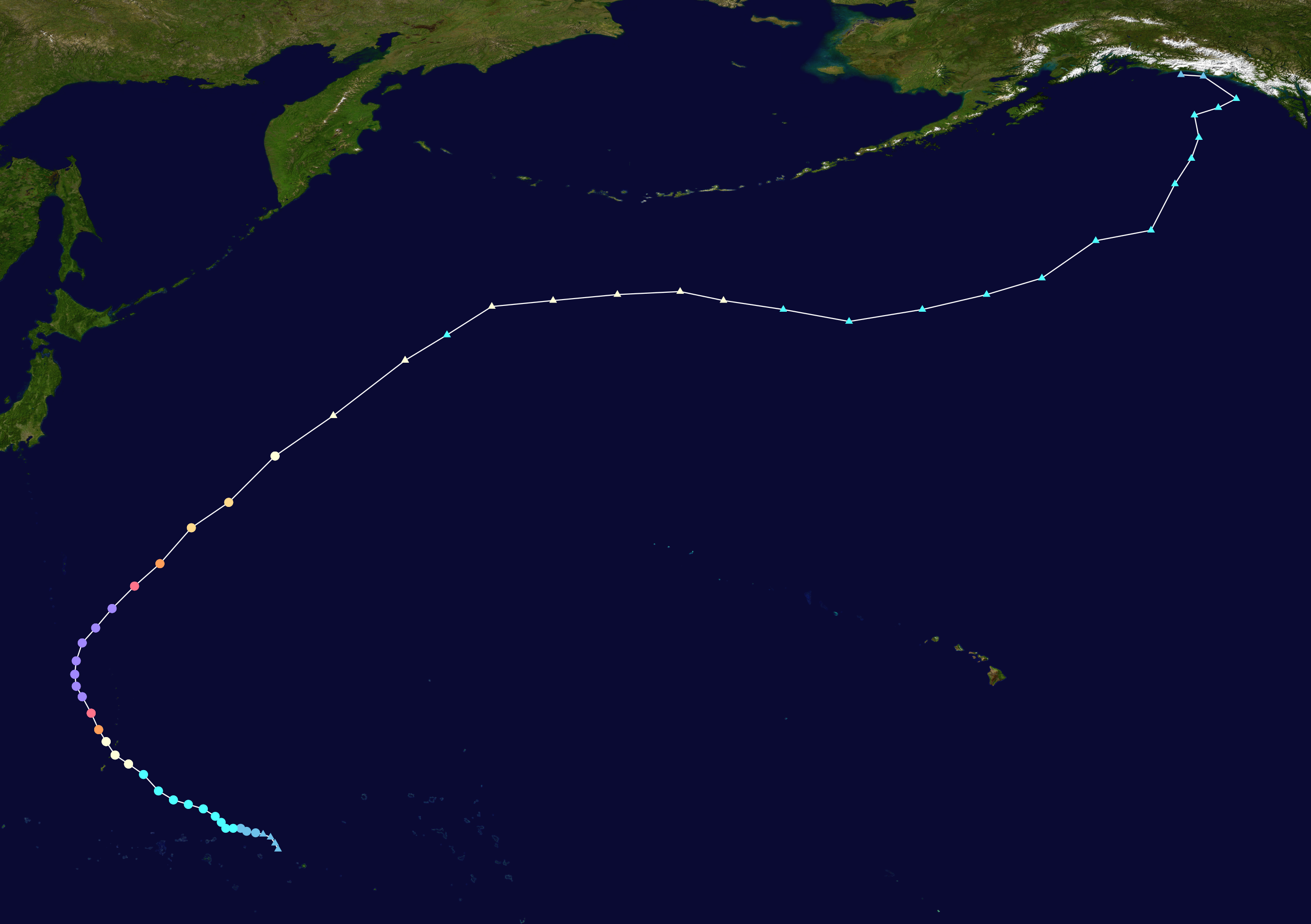
Map plotting the storm's track and intensity, according to the Saffir–Simpson scale Map key Saffir–Simpson scale Tropical depression (≤38 mph, ≤62 km/h) Tropical storm (39–73 mph, 63–118 km/h) Category 1 (74–95 mph, 119–153 km/h) Category 2 (96–110 mph, 154–177 km/h) Category 3 (111–129 mph, 178–208 km/h) Category 4 (130–156 mph, 209–251 km/h) Category 5 (≥157 mph, ≥252 km/h) Unknown Storm type Tropical cyclone Subtropical cyclone Extratropical cyclone, remnant low, tropical disturbance, or monsoon depression

On October 6, an area of convection, or thunderstorms, was associated with a circulation near the Federated States of Micronesia (FSM). Located in an area of warm sea surface temperatures of around 86 °F (30 °C), the weather system experienced favorable conditions for tropical cyclone development, with low wind shear, spiraling rainbands, and outflow in two directions. At 06:00 UTC, the Japan Meteorological Agency (JMA) designated the system a tropical depression, and shortly thereafter, the American-based Joint Typhoon Warning Center (JTWC) issued a tropical cyclone formation alert. With weak steering currents from a subtropical ridge to the northwest, the nascent tropical depression drifted as it slowly organized. Early on October 7, the JTWC designated the system as Tropical Depression 15W. Later that day, the JMA upgraded the system to Tropical Storm Bolaven.

At first, the circulation of Bolaven was elongated and ill-defined, with a general movement to the northwest. Despite the presence of dry air near the center, the storm slowly intensified as the convection deepened, and the outflow was amplified by a tropical upper tropospheric trough to its northeast. Hot towers developed into tightly wound rainbands, a sign of a maturing tropical storm. Late on October 8, the JMA upgraded Bolaven to a severe tropical storm. Some wind shear prevented quicker intensification, although there were signs of a developing eyewall as early as October 9. On October 10, the JMA and the JTWC both upgraded Bolaven to typhoon status while the storm was approaching the Marianas Islands. That day, the typhoon passed just south of Saipan in the Northern Marianas Islands (NMI). As it moved away from the NMI, Bolaven underwent rapid intensification, developing a well-defined eye in the center of the convection. The JTWC described the environmental conditions as "near ideal", citing the low wind shear, high water temperature, and well-established outflow.

Bolaven showing a clear eye shortly after passing through the Mariana Islands on October 11

Early on October 11, the JTWC upgraded Bolaven to a super typhoon, estimating sustained winds of 260 km/h (160 mph). By that time, the storm had a well-defined 28 km (17 mi) wide eye exhibiting the stadium effect. The JTWC estimated that Bolaven peaked with 1-minute sustained winds of 305 km/h (190 mph). Thereafter, Bolaven began to weaken from increased wind shear. Unfavorable conditions rapidly weakened Bolaven below super typhoon strength on October 13, as it recurved northeastward. Bolaven began its extratropical transition on October 14, ceasing the issuance of bulletins from the JTWC. The remnants of the storm went on to effect Alaska and British Columbia.

== Preparations and impact ==
From October 7 to October 14, reports of flooding was reported on Chuuk in Micronesia, with the island being battered with winds of 106 km/h. On October 10, Bolaven moved through the Northern Marianas Islands, while the archipelago was still recovering from the damaging passage of Typhoon Mawar five months earlier. Saipan International Airport recorded sustained winds of 89 km/h (55 mph), along with typhoon-force gusts of 126 km/h (78 mph). The high winds knocked down trees and cut electricity for the islands of Tinian and Rota, while parts of Saipan also lost power.

Guam, located south of Saipan, reported wind gusts of 80 km/h (49 mph) at Antonio B. Won Pat International Airport. Over 7 in (180 mm) of rain were reported shortly after the storm passed through, and all citizens were asked to stay off roads due to dangerous conditions caused by the typhoon.

In Alaska, Ketchikan was put under a high wind warning as the remnants of the storm approached. Rainfall in Ketchikan was 6.69 in (170 mm) on October 17, a daily record. After merging with another extratropical storm in the Gulf of Alaska, the remnants brought rain to parts of southern British Columbia, where Effingham Point, along the Sunshine Coast, recorded 276.4 mm (10.88 in).

Following the system's passage and impact to the Northern Mariana Islands, the United States Coast Guard vessel Myrtle Hazard arrived with thousands of packages of pet food, and they assessed the other needs of people on the islands.

== See also ==
- Weather of 2023
- Tropical cyclones in 2023
- List of Alaska tropical cyclones
- Typhoon June (1975) – A very intense typhoon which took a similar path, passing southeast of Japan
- Typhoon Bualoi (2019) – An intense typhoon which took a similar path
- Typhoon Lekima (2013) – Another intense typhoon which took a similar path
- Typhoon Mawar (2023) – Category 5 super typhoon of similar intensity that severely struck the Northern Mariana Islands five months prior to Bolaven
