= Typhoon Merbok (2022) =

Pacific typhoon in 2022

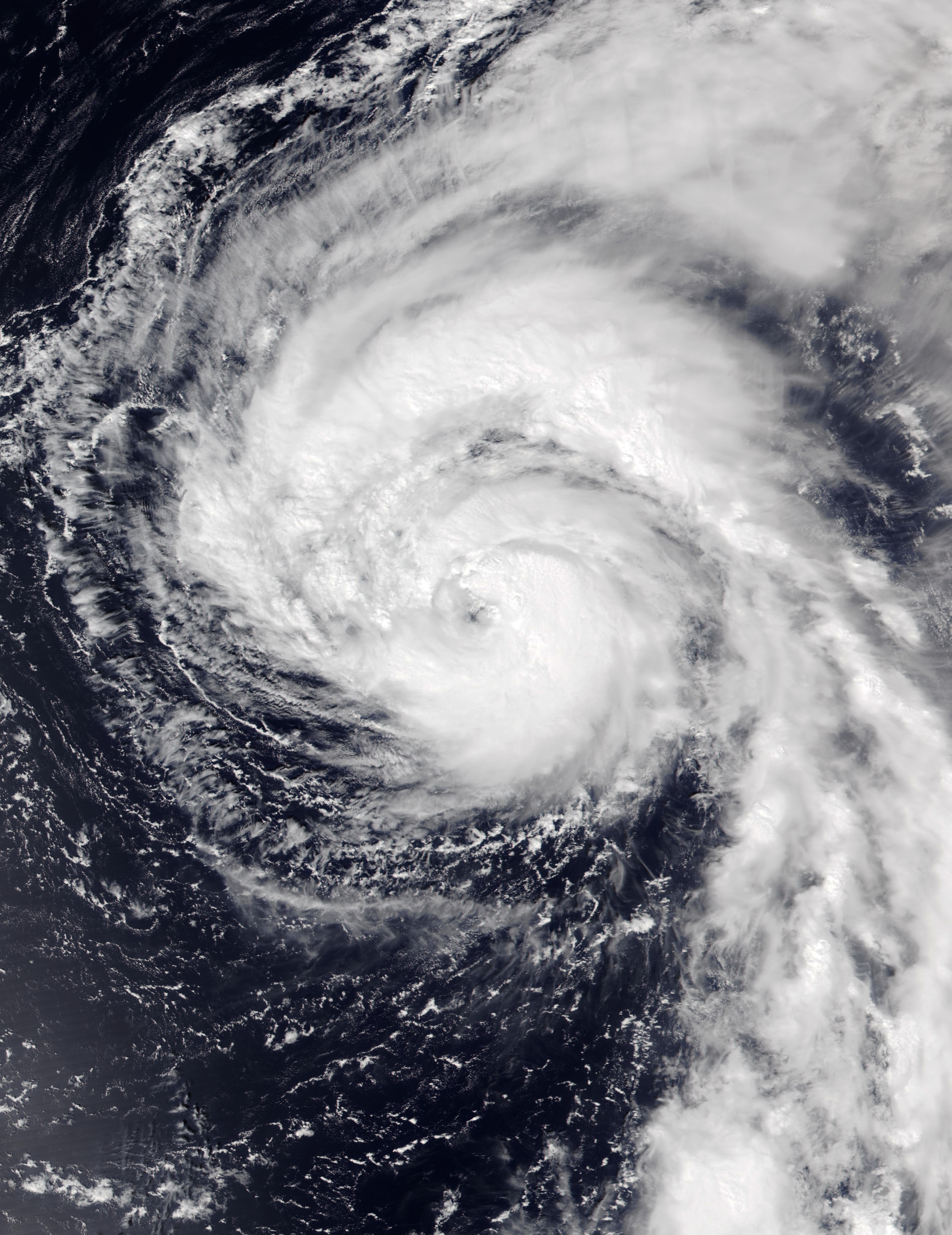
- Merbok near peak intensity over the West Pacific on September 14

Meteorological history
- Formed: September 10, 2022
- Extratropical: September 15, 2022
- Dissipated: September 21, 2022

Typhoon
- 10-minute sustained (JMA)
- Highest winds: 130 km/h (80 mph)
- Lowest pressure: 965 hPa (mbar); 28.50 inHg (940 mbar (28 inHg) while extratropical)

Category 1-equivalent typhoon
- 1-minute sustained (SSHWS/JTWC)
- Highest winds: 130 km/h (80 mph)
- Lowest pressure: 976 hPa (mbar); 28.82 inHg (968 mbar (28.6 inHg) while extratropical)

Overall effects
- Damage: Unknown
- Areas affected: Alaska
- IBTrACS
- Part of the 2022 Pacific typhoon season

Typhoon Merbok (Note: The name Merbok (Malay: merbok, [mərbok]) was contributed by Malaysia and refers to the zebra dove (Geopelia striata) in Malay.) was the most intense storm to impact Alaska in the month of September in over 70 years. The fifteenth tropical depression, thirteenth tropical storm, and sixth typhoon of the 2022 Pacific typhoon season, Merbok formed in the West Pacific from a low-pressure area west of Wake Island on September 10. Over the next few days, the storm began to strengthen, reaching typhoon intensity on September 13. Merbok tracked northward, becoming an extratropical cyclone early on September 15. As an extratropical cyclone, it deepened before entering the Bering Sea as a powerful storm. Along the coast of Alaska, Merbok inflicted powerful storm surge, flooding, and severe wind across many Alaskan communities.

== Meteorological history ==
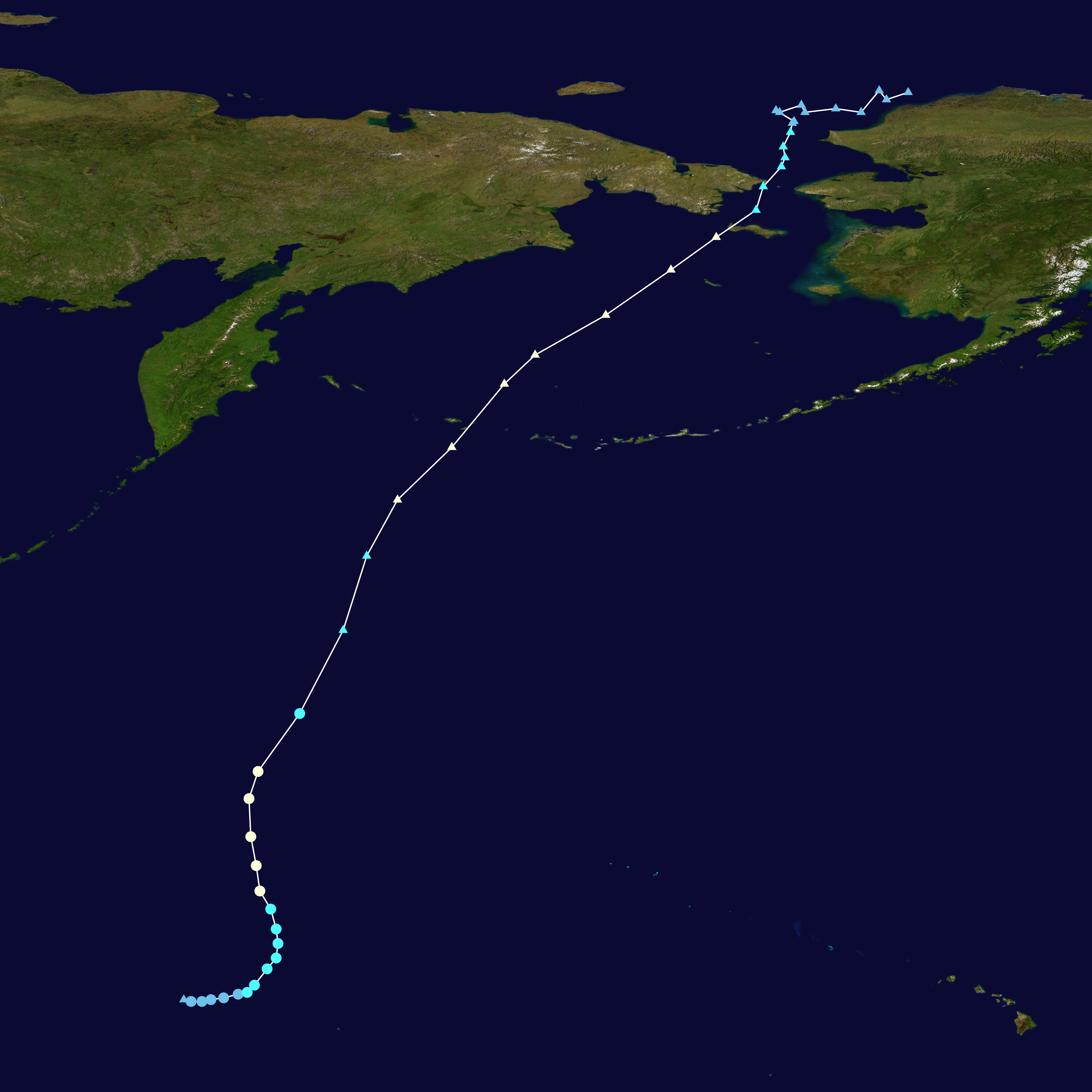
Map plotting the storm's track and intensity, according to the Saffir–Simpson scale Map key Saffir–Simpson scale Tropical depression (≤38 mph, ≤62 km/h) Tropical storm (39–73 mph, 63–118 km/h) Category 1 (74–95 mph, 119–153 km/h) Category 2 (96–110 mph, 154–177 km/h) Category 3 (111–129 mph, 178–208 km/h) Category 4 (130–156 mph, 209–251 km/h) Category 5 (≥157 mph, ≥252 km/h) Unknown Storm type Tropical cyclone Subtropical cyclone Extratropical cyclone, remnant low, tropical disturbance, or monsoon depression

On 00:00 UTC of September 9, the Japan Meteorological Agency (JMA) began tracking a weak tropical depression that had developed west of Wake Island. The JMA downgraded the system to a low-pressure area shortly thereafter. However, on the next day, the JMA re-upgraded the system to a tropical depression. The Joint Typhoon Warning Center (JTWC) followed suit and began issuing advisories, assigning it the designation 15W. In its fifth bulletin, the JTWC stated that 15W turned into a tropical storm when it reached 65 km/h (40 mph; 35 kn) one-minute sustained winds. The JMA named the system Merbok on September 12, due to it having achieved 10-minute sustained winds of 65 km/h (40 mph). Later that day, Merbok reached severe tropical storm status. The next day, the JTWC reported that Merbok became a Category 1 typhoon, reaching sustained winds of 120 km/h (75 mph; 65 kn). On September 15, the JTWC gave its final bulletin on Merbok, noting that it had moved away from habitable areas.

After transitioning into an extratropical cyclone, the system tracked generally northeastward and continued to deepen as it encountered record warm waters near the western Aleutian Islands. It crossed the islands, entering the Bering Sea late on September 15 (HDT) as it maintained hurricane-force winds and reached its minimum central barometric pressure of 937 mbar (27.67 inHg) early the next day.

== Impact ==
The storm track generated a large dynamic fetch across the Bering Sea, which contributed to a dangerous storm surge that inundated at least 35 communities across 1,300 miles of coastline in western Alaska. Governor Mike Dunleavy declared a state of emergency in the region before the cyclone hit. Water levels in Unalakleet peaked at around 12.5 ft (3.8 m), which was among its largest peaks on record. In Golovin, the 1913 record of flooding was broken. Significant flooding and gale force winds were widely reported across the west coast of Alaska. Homes floated off their foundations, major erosion, subsistence infrastructure damage, and power outages were reported in Hooper Bay, Nome, Shaktoolik, Newtok, and Kotlik among others. The typhoon also destroyed 1,000 mi (1,600 km) of coastline, devastating multiple fish camps in western Alaska. Despite the widespread coastal flooding, no injuries were reported.

== Aftermath ==
A disaster declaration was issued for Alaska following the storm; on September 23, president Joe Biden approved the state's request for federal aid. The Federal Emergency Management Agency was investigated for providing unintelligible translations of relief information into two languages used by Alaska Natives; the company that had contracted to provide the translations was fired by the agency following the investigation.

The storm also led to a emphasis on studying environmental data from western Alaska; the region had previously been largely neglected from such studies.

== See also ==
- Other storms of the same name
- List of Alaska tropical cyclones
