= Tropical cyclones in Russia =

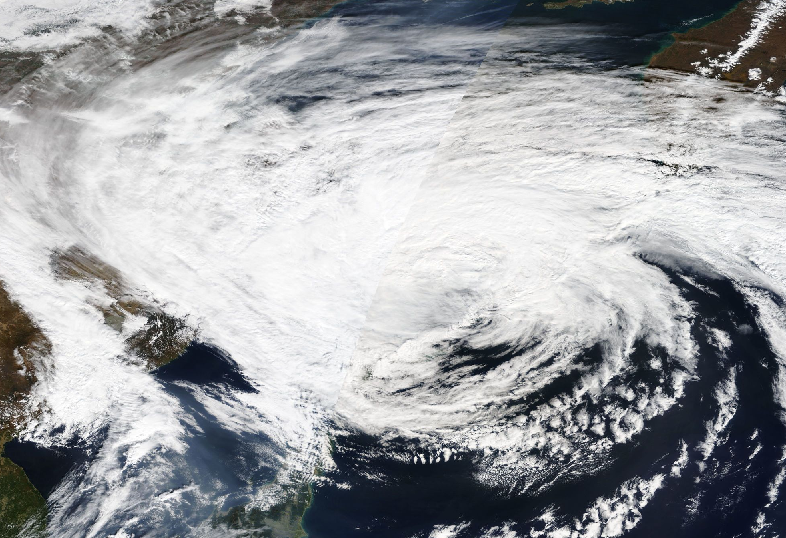
An extratropical low, formerly Tropical Storm Choi-wan, affecting southeastern Russia in October 2015

Russia is a nation in Eastern Europe and North Asia which is susceptible to the possibility for tropical cyclones to significantly impact its coastal regions. Many of these cyclones affect Siberia, especially Primorsky Krai and the Sakhalin Oblast as extratropical cyclones. However, a minority have affected European Russia.

Of the tropical cyclones which track into Russia from the east, many of them traveled through Northeast China, the Yellow Sea, the Sea of Okhotsk, entering the Kamchatka Peninsula as a result. A 2022 study stated that this may be in part due to an interaction with a mid-latitude trough. Many typhoons track into Russia as weakening cyclones, however, if a tropical cyclone is intense, some may track into the nation as typhoons despite the wind speed reduction caused by high latitudes. Studies have stated that due to global climate change, in the near future, there will be a probable northwards shift of tropical cyclone trajectories into the Russian Far East.

== Events ==
=== Pre-1990s ===
- August 1896 – A powerful typhoon tracked into the Yellow Sea, and on the night of August 6-7, passed through the outskirts of modern-day Ussuriysk. This typhoon caused heavy rains in the Razdolnaya River, which caused many bridges and dams to be destroyed and interrupted communication with Vladivostok. At least two deaths occurred due to this cyclone, as a lieutenant and rifleman of the 5th East Siberian Battalion drowned while rescuing the dying; their bodies were later found when the water subsided.
- September 10–11, 1956 – A weakening Typhoon Emma struck the eastern and southeastern parts of Primorye, producing hurricane-force winds of 78–89 mph (126–143 km/h) as it approached the region. The strongest typhoon by wind speed in Russian history, Emma would have an adverse impact in the region. Rivers in the southern Sikhote-Alin Mountains overflowed, flooding many areas. The Amur River rose up 7.2 m (24 ft) with Emma's wind-enabled storm surge caused significant destruction throughout Primorye.
- August 14–16, 1959 – A weakening Tropical Storm Georgia made landfall near Preobrazheniye, Primorsky Krai, Soviet Union with winds of 60 mph (95 km/h) around 15:00 UTC on August 14.
- August 18, 1979 – Tropical Storm Irving tracked into Primorye, producing hurricane-force winds in the region. In some locations, Irving brought up to 200 mm (7.9 in) of rain, causing flooding in the rivers of Primorye and Khabarovsk Krai.

=== 1990s ===
- July 1994 – The remnants of Typhoon Tim crossed into Russia from China, affecting the northern regions of Primorye. As a result, residential buildings were flooded in 18 settlements, with the city of Dalnerechensk alone suffering ₽5 billion (USD$1.4 billion) in damage.
- August 1994 – The remnants of Typhoon Ellie would affect fifteen settlements in Primorsky Krai and Khabarovsk Krai, producing two months of rainfall, 200 mm (7.9 in), over the districts in a few days.
- September 1994 – The remnants of Typhoon Melissa struck Primorsky Krai, causing flooding in the southern region. Some locations received 345 mm (13.6 in) of rainfall.
- October 26, 1996 – The remnants of Typhoon Carlo would deepen over Far East Russia, prior to moving north over the extreme western Bering Sea and crossing into Alaska on October 27.
- October 1, 1999 – The remnants of Typhoon Olga caused heavy gusts in portions of Kamchatka Krai.

=== 2000s ===
- September 2000 – The weak remnants of Saomai began impacting Russia, flooding coal retrieval sites and cutting down on electric power supplies in Primorsky Krai. Due to the shortages, electric power was transferred there from other surrounding areas. Furthermore, a 50 percent decrease in electricity output was documented at the local power station in Luchegorsk. To the south, an overflowing of the Kazachka River prompted the evacuation of over 60 people. Overall, 55 automobile accidents occurred in eastern Russia, leading to nine fatalities and 76 people injured.
- August–September 2002 – The extratropical remnants of Tropical Storm Bolaven brought extreme flooding to Primorsky Krai. This caused 600 million rubles (USD$20 million) in damage.
- September 2002 – The remnants of Typhoon Rusa affected the Russian Far East. On Sakhalin Island, Rusa's remnants dropped heavy rainfall, the equivalence of two months average precipitation. The rains flooded 350 houses, but there were no deaths in the region.

=== 2010s ===
- September 12, 2011 – An extratropical cyclone, formerly Hurricane Katia, moved across northern Scotland, later being absorbed by a larger extratropical storm on September 13. This extratropical low would produce power outages in Russia.
- August 11–12, 2014 – The remnants of Typhoon Halong would make landfall in Russia's Far East, causing a death and at least 52 injuries in Sakhalin. In Yuzhno-Sakhalinsk, more than 24,000 residents lost power after wind gusts reached 94 mph (151 km/h). Additionally, torrential rains and high winds would occur in the Khabarovsk, Primorye and the Sakhalin regions, as well as the Jewish Autonomous Oblast.
- October 1–2, 2015 – The remnant vortex of Typhoon Dujuan, which was moving from Japan to Sakhalin, merged with a "deep rain cyclone" just south of Sakhalin, becoming a hurricane-force extratropical low. This low would uproot over 600 trees and tear off the roof of a residential building in Korsakov. Due to this cyclone, 16 people were hospitalized and 1 person died. Cape Crillon received gusts of 140 mph (63 m/s) while Yuzhno-Sakhalinsk received gusts of 35 m/s (78 mph). Elsewhere, downpours flooded the village of Novoselskoye, causing 30 people to be evacuated.
- October 9, 2015 – The remnants of Tropical Storm Choi-wan would produce heavy rains and hurricane-force gusts in Southeastern Russia.

=== 2020s ===
- September 4, 2020 – The remnants of Typhoon Maysak struck the Primorsky Krai as an extratropical cyclone, killing three people and causing ₽200 million (US$2.65 million) in losses.
- August 2023 – The remnants of Typhoon Khanun brought heavy rains to parts of the Primorsky Krai in the Russian Far East, resulting in flooding. Three casualties were reported in Russia. Preliminary damage of the region were about ₽7 billion (US$70 million).
