= 2023 Pacific typhoon season =

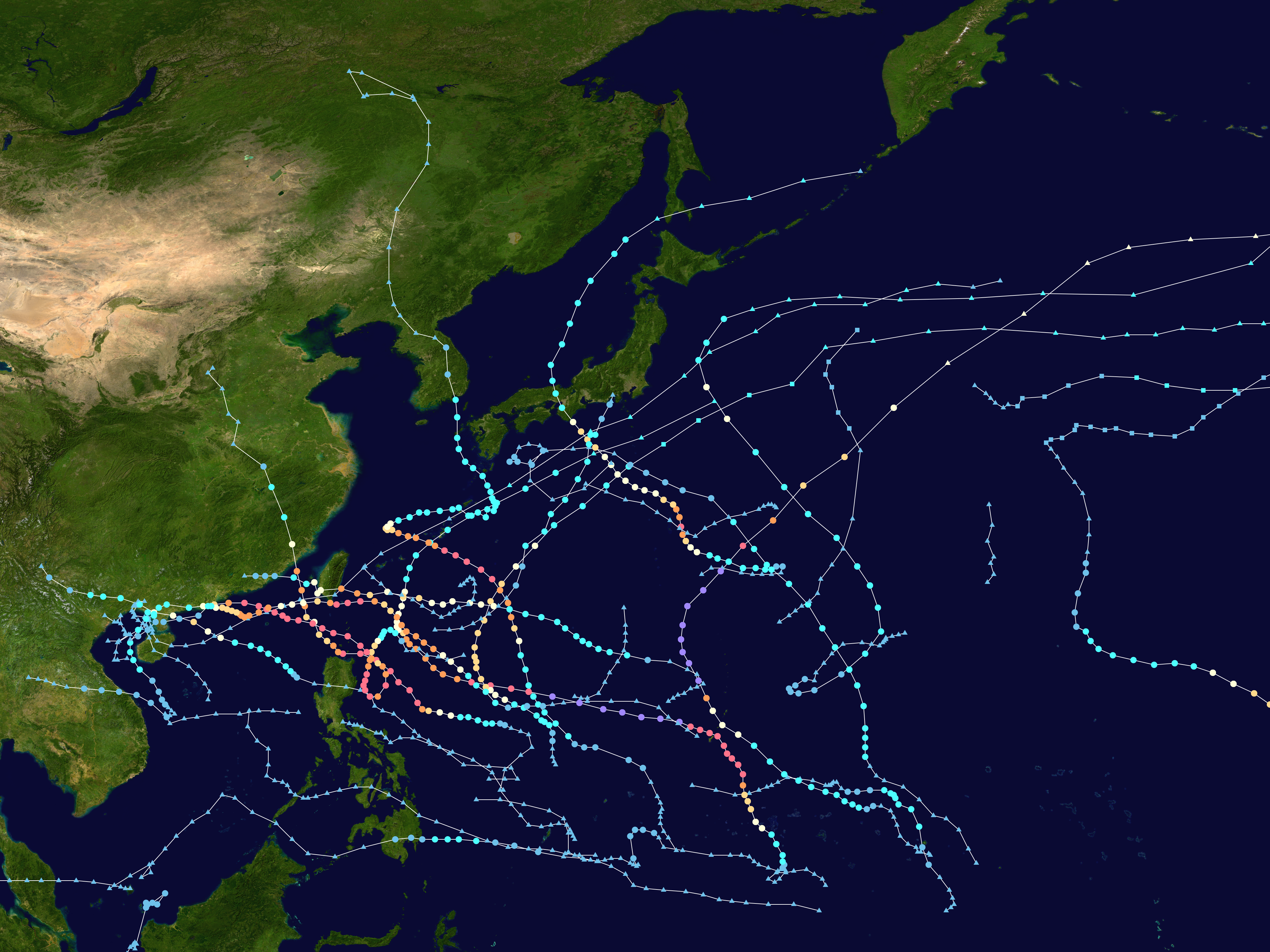
- Season summary map

Seasonal boundaries
- First system formed: February 20, 2023
- Last system dissipated: December 18, 2023

Strongest storm
- Name: Mawar
  - Maximum winds: 215 km/h (130 mph) (10-minute sustained)
  - Lowest pressure: 900 hPa (mbar)

Seasonal statistics
- Total depressions: 30
- Total storms: 17
- Typhoons: 10
- Very strong typhoons: 8
- Violent typhoons: 3
- Total fatalities: 224 total
- Total damage: $39.2 billion (2023 USD) (Costliest Pacific typhoon season on record)

Related articles
- 2023 Atlantic hurricane season; 2023 Pacific hurricane season; 2023 North Indian Ocean cyclone season

The 2023 Pacific typhoon season was the fourth and final string of consecutive below-average Pacific typhoon season and became the third-least active on record in terms of named storms, with only 17 developing, surpassing only the 2010 and 1998 seasons. However, the season was near-average in terms of accumulated cyclone energy (ACE). Despite occurring during an El Niño event, which typically favors increased activity in the basin, overall development was unusually suppressed. This was mainly attributed to a prolonged negative phase of the Pacific decadal oscillation (PDO), which generally inhibits tropical cyclone formation in the region. The season was less active than the 2023 Atlantic hurricane season in terms of named storms—the fourth such occurrence on record, after 2005, 2010, and 2020. All but one of the 17 storms during the season originated from the northwestern Pacific itself, as the other one, Dora, originated from the Eastern Pacific basin. As a result, the northwest Pacific recorded fewer storm formations than the 2023 Pacific hurricane season.

Of the 17 systems, ten intensified into typhoons, and four further strengthened into super typhoons. Despite the low number of storms, the season proved to be highly destructive, mainly due to Typhoon Doksuri, which devastated northern Philippines, Taiwan, and China in July, becoming the costliest typhoon on record and the costliest to strike mainland China; and Typhoon Haikui in September, which caused widespread damage across China, Taiwan, and Hong Kong. Activity across Southeast Asia was notably limited, with no tropical storm making landfall in mainland Vietnam, the third such occurrence since the country's independence, following the 1976 and 2002 seasons.

The season ran throughout the year, though most tropical cyclones typically develop between May and October. The season's first named storm, Sanvu, formed on April 21, while its last named storm, Jelawat, dissipated on December 20. In May, Typhoon Mawar intensified into the first typhoon of the season on May 21 and then further intensified into season's first super typhoon on May 25, becoming one of the strongest Northern Hemisphere tropical cyclones on record in May.

The scope of this article is limited to the Pacific Ocean north of the equator between 100°E and the 180th meridian. Within the northwestern Pacific Ocean, two separate agencies assign names to tropical cyclones, which can result in a system having two names. The Japan Meteorological Agency (JMA) (Note: The Japan Meteorological Agency is the official Regional Specialized Meteorological Centre for the western Pacific Ocean.) names a tropical cyclone when it is estimated to have 10-minute sustained winds of at least 65 km/h (40 mph) anywhere in the basin. The Philippine Atmospheric, Geophysical and Astronomical Services Administration (PAGASA) assigns names to tropical cyclones that move into or form as a tropical depression within the Philippine Area of Responsibility (PAR), defined as the area between 135°E and 115°E and between 5°N and 25°N, regardless of whether the JMA has already named the system. Tropical depressions monitored by the United States Joint Typhoon Warning Center (JTWC) (Note: The Joint Typhoon Warning Center is a joint United States Navy–United States Air Force task force that issues tropical cyclone warnings for the western Pacific Ocean and other regions.) are given a numerical designation with a "W" suffix, which means "west", a reference to the western Pacific region. (Note: A super typhoon is an unofficial category used by the JTWC for a typhoon with winds of at least 240 km/h (150 mph).)

== Seasonal forecasts ==
| TSR forecasts Date | Tropical storms | Total Typhoons | Intense TCs | ACE | Ref. |
|---|---|---|---|---|---|
| Average (1965–2022) | 25.7 | 16.1 | 8.7 | 290 | |
| May 5, 2023 | 29 | 19 | 13 | 394 | |
| July 7, 2023 | 29 | 19 | 12 | 382 | |
| August 8, 2023 | 29 | 20 | 14 | 393 | |
| Other forecasts Date | Forecast Center | Period | | Systems | Ref. |
| January 13, 2023 | PAGASA | January–March | | 0–2 tropical cyclones | |
| January 13, 2023 | PAGASA | April–June | | 2–4 tropical cyclones | |
| June 27, 2023 | PAGASA | July–September | | 7–10 tropical cyclones | |
| June 27, 2023 | PAGASA | October–December | | 4–7 tropical cyclones | |
| 2023 season | Forecast Center | Tropical cyclones | Tropical storms | Typhoons | Ref. |
| Actual activity: | JMA | 29 | 17 | 10 | |
| Actual activity: | JTWC | 18 | 17 | 12 | |
| Actual activity: | PAGASA | 11 | 9 | 7 | |

During the year, several national meteorological services and scientific agencies forecast how many tropical cyclones, tropical storms, and typhoons will form during a season and/or how many tropical cyclones will affect a particular country. These agencies included the Tropical Storm Risk (TSR) Consortium of University College London, PAGASA and Taiwan's Central Weather Bureau.

The first forecast was released by PAGASA on January 13, 2023, in their monthly seasonal climate outlook predicting the first half of 2023. They predicted that only 0–2 tropical cyclones were expected to form or enter the Philippine Area of Responsibility between January and March, while 2–4 tropical cyclones are expected to form between April and June. PAGASA also stated that weakening La Niña conditions could last until it transitions back into ENSO-neutral conditions afterwards.

On May 5, Tropical Storm Risk (TSR) issued its first forecast for the 2023 season with moderate to strong El Niño expected to develop and persist through October, TSR predicted that tropical activity for 2023 will be above average predicting 29 named storms, 19 typhoons and 13 intense typhoons. The TSR remained constant with their prediction except slightly decreasing the intense typhoon numbers to 12 in the July forecast. In the last August forecast, the TSR increased the number of typhoons and intense typhoons to 20 and 14.

== Seasonal summary ==
Costliest known Pacific typhoon seasons
| Rank | Total damages | Season |
|---|---|---|
| 1 | $38.54 billion | 2019 |
| 2 | $38.06 billion | 2023 |
| 3 | $30.59 billion | 2018 |
| 4 | $29.62 billion | 2024 |
| 5 | $26.45 billion | 2013 |
| 6 | $21.05 billion | 2012 |
| 7 | $18.77 billion | 2004 |
| 8 | $17.44 billion | 1991 |
| 9 | $17.18 billion | 2000 |
| 10 | $16.96 billion | 2016 |

=== Early season activity ===
The season began with a weak tropical depression off the coast of northeastern Philippines on February 20. Two weeks later, on March 4, another tropical depression formed near the equator, east of Singapore. The depression was short lived and was last noted three days later. The storm however, brought heavy rainfall across Malaysia, affecting about 50,000 people.

A month later on April 7, the JMA began tracking a low-pressure area located in the Philippines Sea. On the same day the JMA classified the system as a tropical depression with the PAGASA naming the system Amang. The depression made three landfalls in Panganiban, Catanduanes; Presentacion, Camarines Sur; and Lagonoy, Camarines Sur, before weakening into a remnant low on April 13. Amang caused minor damage across the country however, no fatalities were reported. Five days after Amang dissipated, the JMA began monitoring another disturbance located near Pohnpei. After slowly intensifying, the system reached tropical storm status and the system was named Sanvu by the JMA; becoming the first named storm in the basin. Sanvu however began to weaken after entering hostile environment. The storm weakened back into a tropical depression until it dissipated on April 25.

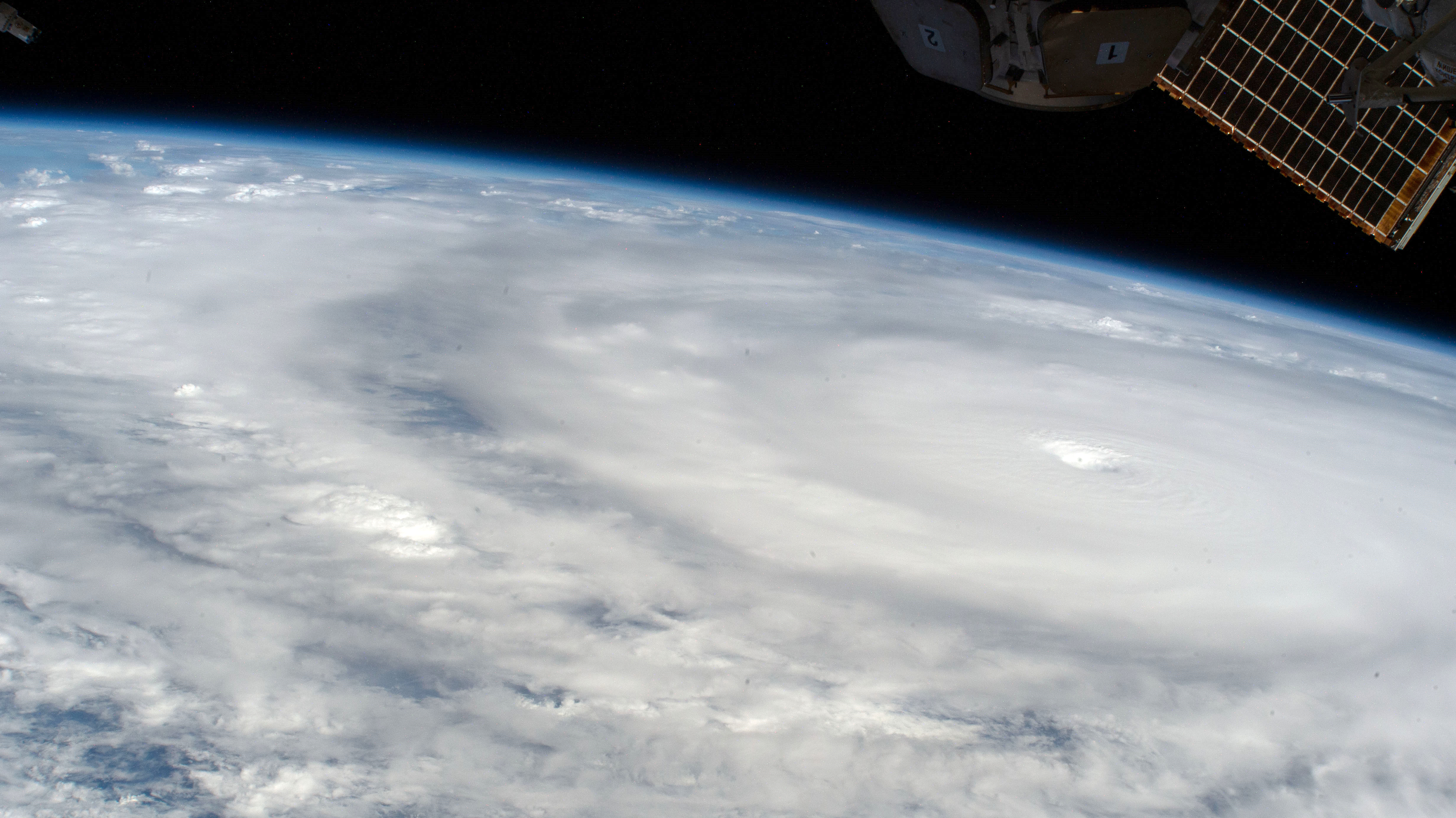
Typhoon Mawar as viewed from the International Space Station on May 23.

On May 5, a tropical depression was noted in the Sulu Sea by the JMA. The system crossed Palawan and entered the South China Sea on the same day. The system continued to traverse the South China Sea before dissipating on May 7. On May 19, a tropical depression developed south-southwest of the Chuuk Islands. A few hours later, it became a tropical storm and was named Mawar. On the next day, the JMA upgraded the system to a severe tropical storm, as the storm was getting better defined. A day later, Mawar was classified as a Category 1-equivalent typhoon by the JTWC. The JMA followed suit and designated the system as a Typhoon on the same day; becoming the first typhoon of the year in the basin. Mawar later strengthened into a Category 2-equivalent typhoon on May 22. Then, the storm began to explosively intensify and reached Category 3-equivalent status on the same day. It further strengthened into a Category 4-equivalent super typhoon on the next day as it approached Guam. Land interaction with Guam and an eyewall replacement cycle caused the storm to weaken slightly but eventually restrengthened after passing the northern tip of Guam on May 24. The next day, Mawar completed its eyewall replacement cycle and went on to reach its peak intensity of 295 km/h (185 mph), making it a very strong Category 5-equivalent super typhoon. As Mawar entered the PAR which was named Betty by PAGASA, it encountered cooler oceans and increasing wind shear which caused it to weaken. It also underwent yet another eyewall replacement cycle causing the storm to weaken further. It affected the eastern coast of Luzon and weakened to a severe tropical storm as it left the PAR on June 1. It affected the Okinawa Islands and finally turned extratropical south of Honshu on June 3.

On June 5, a low-pressure area was formed north of Palau, naming the system as Invest 98W. At the following day, it intensified and entered the Philippine area of responsibility, prompting PAGASA to name the storm as Chedeng at 08:00 UTC. The JTWC later followed suit and designated it as 03W. At 20:00 UTC, Chedeng was upgraded to a tropical storm, receiving the international name Guchol. Guchol later became a strong Category 2-equivalent typhoon in the Philippine Sea, but the cold wake from Typhoon Mawar kept it from intensifying any further. As Guchol (Chedeng) exited the PAR, it weakened to a severe tropical storm, and continued northeastwards, avoiding the Japanese archipelago.

On July 13, a monsoon depression formed near Luzon. PAGASA noted the system and subsequently named the system Dodong. The system then crossed the island. The system then entered the South China Sea, where it became a tropical depression. Later, it became a tropical storm. It was named Talim. Talim moved through the South China Sea as it intensified. Near the coast of China, Talim reached its peak intensity as a Category 2-equivalent typhoon. Talim slightly weakened before making landfall in China at 22:20 CST. About six hours later, Talim entered the Gulf of Tonkin and made a second landfall. On July 18, Talim dissipated inland.

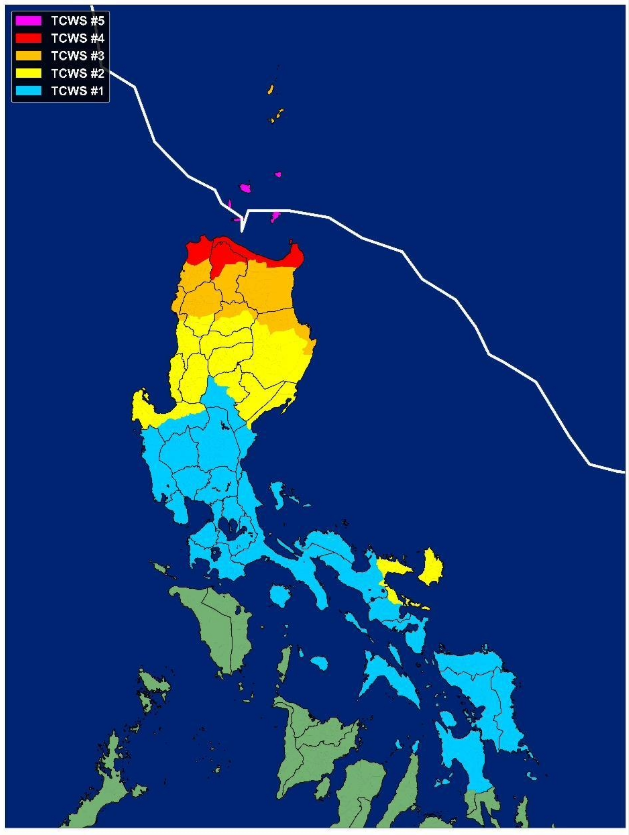
Highest Tropical Cyclone Wind Signal issued by PAGASA for Typhoon Doksuri in each province in the Philippines.

On July 19, the JMA began tracking a disturbance in the Philippine Sea. On July 21, the JMA noticed it had begun to become more organized and it was upgraded into a tropical storm, with the name given being Doksuri. The PAGASA also noted the formation and gave it the name Egay. On July 23, the system began to intensify rapidly, and achieved typhoon status. Late on July 24, the JTWC classified it as a super typhoon. The next morning the PAGASA did the same thing as on that day it reached its peak of 1 minute sustained winds of 240 km/h (150 mph). Doksuri began to slow as it reached the northern Philippines. With dry air in the area, Doksuri started to undergo an eyewall replacement cycle. As a mid-range Category-4 typhoon, Doksuri made landfall over Fuga Island in Aparri, Cagayan. Hours later, it made another landfall in Dalupiri Island. The storm eventually began to de-intensify following the eyewall replacement. However, as it exited the region on July 27, it began reintensifying. It was now heading toward Taiwan and China with 1 minute sustained winds of 120 mph. On July 28, it made its last landfall in China; however, it rapidly began to weaken. On July 29, Doksuri dissipated inland over China.

Satellite loop of Tropical Storm Khanun a few hours before landfall in South Korea on August 10.

After Doksuri devastated several countries, JMA announced another formation of a low-pressure area in the Pacific Ocean. The JMA later issued a warning, declaring it as a tropical depression. The system also indicated that the system is in a favorable environment for development. On July 27, the JTWC subsequently issued advisories for the system and classified the system as Tropical Depression 06W. Despite its disorganized structure, both agencies upgraded the system into a tropical storm, with JMA assigning the name Khanun.

Khanun later entered the Philippine Area of Responsibility (PAR), gaining the name Falcon by PAGASA. Tracking northward due to a nearby mid-level subtropical high-pressure area, Khanun intensified into a severe tropical storm. Over 24 hours, its maximum sustained wind speeds grew by 130 km/h (80 mph) and eventually reached a peak of 220 km/h (140 mph), equivalent to Category 4 status on the Saffir–Simpson scale. As it left PAR on August 1, Khanun weakened slightly as it moved move closer to the Ryukyu Islands, battering them with heavy rain and strong winds. Khanun weakened further due to an ongoing eyewall replacement cycle, allowing its eye to grow massively, but degrading its overall structure.

Following structural weakening, the JMA and JTWC downgraded Khanun to a severe tropical storm, with estimated winds of 95 km/h (60 mph). After passing north of Tokunoshima, the storm accelerated to the southeast. Satellite imagery showed a consolidating LLCC with formative convective banding and deep convection over the northern semicircle, the storm passed the southwestern island of Kyushu. Around 00:00 UTC on August 10, Khanun made landfall on Geojedo Islands in South Korea with winds of 85 km/h (50 mph). The JMA continued to monitor Khanun as a tropical cyclone until early on August 11.

=== Peak season activity ===
On August 5, the JMA reported that a low-pressure area had formed east-northeast of Iwo Jima. Environmental conditions were marginally favorable to conduct a tropical cyclogenesis, with warm sea temperatures, low vertical wind shear, and good outflow. Later that day, JMA named the system Lan as it strengthened into a tropical storm. Lan continues to strengthen more to achieve the peak intensity of 220 km/h (140 mph) by JTWC.

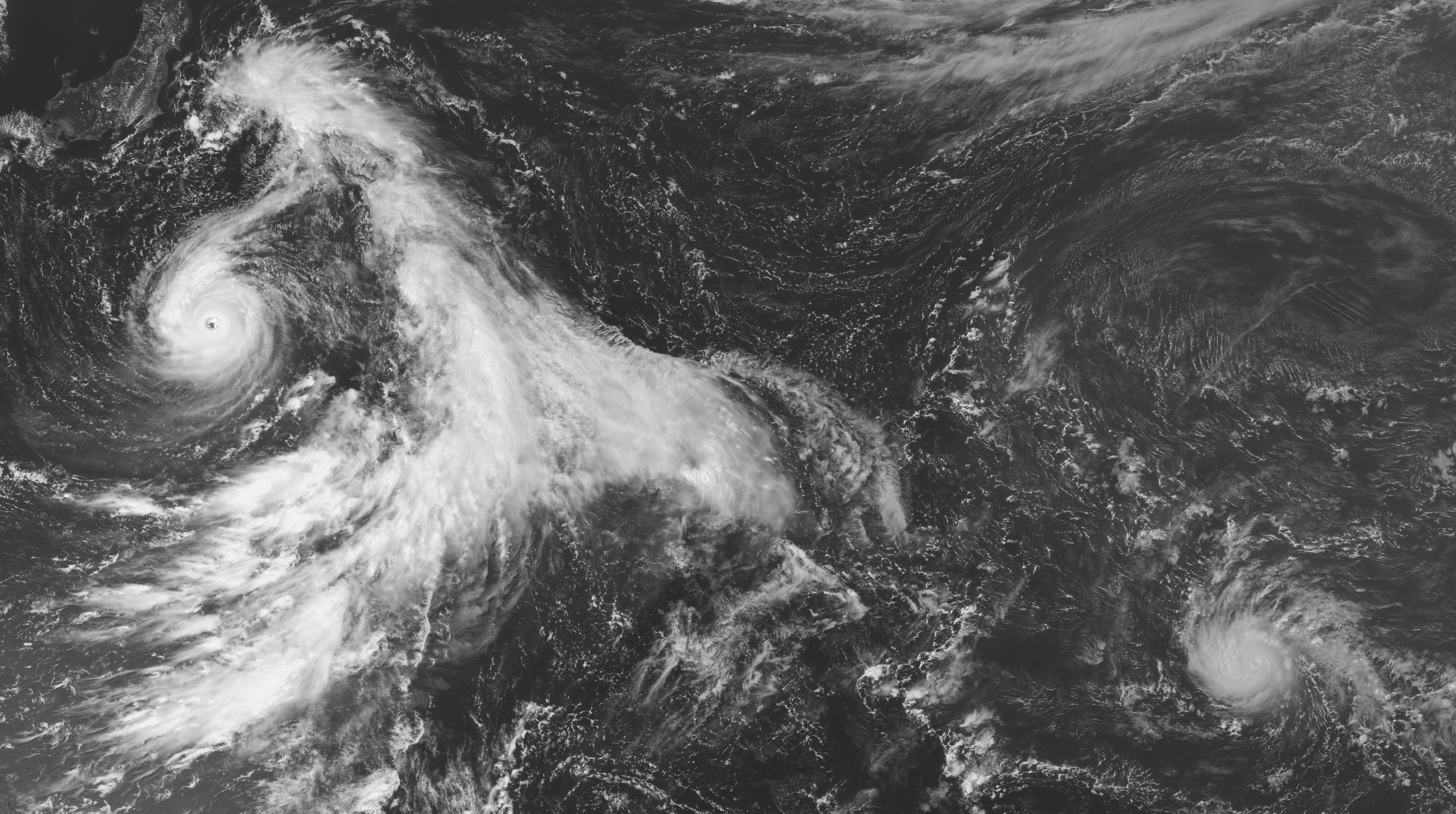
Typhoon Lan and Hurricane Dora developing in the Pacific Ocean on August 11

After reaching its peak intensity, Lan started to track through colder waters, causing the typhoon to weaken significantly. Lan re-strengthened again into a Category-2 typhoon as it strengthened. The storm maintained its overall convective structure, but the waters beneath the cyclone cooled, prompting a quick weakening trend. Around 14:00 UTC on August 14, Lan made landfall on Cape Shionomisaki, Japan. Once inland, Lan weakened into a tropical storm over the region's rough terrain. Lan began to accelerate northeast through Sea of Japan while weakening. JMA declared the system as an extratropical low on August 17.

On August 12, a weakening Hurricane Dora moved into the basin as a Category-2 equivalent typhoon. As a result, both agencies from JMA and JTWC started issuing advisories as it crossed through the International Date Line. Dora showed signs of weakening, citing that its eye continues to deteriorate and the presence of vertical wind shear. With Dora's ragged center, the system remained disorganized, as wind shear was becoming displaced to the east. By August 15, both agencies ceased issuing advisories as their LLCC further became broad and exposed. JMA also stated that Dora transitioned into an extratropical system on August 21 before it headed back in the Central Pacific basin.

Red visible satellite imagery loop of Typhoon Saola rapidly intensifying off the coast of Philippines on August 26, 2023. Maximum sustained winds of 195 km/h were estimated when the images were acquired.

In mid-August, two tropical disturbances were formed on either side of the basin. The first disturbance was recognized east of Taiwan on August 20. On the next day, the second one formed in the open waters of the Western Pacific. Initially, PAGASA expected that the low-pressure area near Taiwan would have a low chance of development. However, on the next day, PAGASA later recognized that the disturbance was named Goring after it was upgraded into a tropical depression. Meanwhile, in the open waters of the Pacific, JTWC designated the system as Tropical Depression 08W. While near the Philippines, JTWC gave the identifier for Goring as Tropical Depression 09W.

On August 24, 09W was upgraded into a tropical storm, which gave the name Saola by the JMA. Saola began to move southwestwards through the Philippine Sea and continued to intensity to a typhoon. Being in warm sea surface temperature, Saola began to rapidly intensify as it loitered off the coast of Luzon. It reached the intensity of a Category-4 typhoon on August 27. After executing a south-southeastward turn over the Philippine Sea, Saola weakened to a Category-2 typhoon. However, on August 29, Saola regained strength and explosively intensified further into a Category-5 super typhoon. Saola crossed through the Babuyan Islands before it left the Philippine Area of Responsibility a few hours later.

Saola remained a powerful super typhoon as it crossed through the South China Sea, and featured a clear and warm eye as it did so. As it drew closer to Hong Kong, Saola was struggling to complete an eyewall replacement cycle, resulting in some slight weakening. Before its approach, the Hong Kong Observatory had issued its Hurricane Signal No. 10 at 20:15 HKT (12:15 UTC), the first time to do so since Typhoon Mangkhut of 2018. On September 1, Saola passed south of Hong Kong and Macau as a mid-Category-4 typhoon, battering with strong winds and heavy rain. Saola weakened into a Category-3 as it made landfall in Guangdong, China on early Saturday. Once inland, Saola began to weaken into a severe tropical storm after landfall. On September 3, all agencies issued their final advisory as Saola dissipated that day.

In the open waters of the basin, 08W received the name Damrey as it moved northward. Avoiding the Japanese islands, Damrey intensified into a Category-1 typhoon and severe tropical storm, respectively by the JTWC and JMA, well east of Japan. It then turned post-tropical on August 29.

Typhoon Haikui developing off the eastern coast of Taiwan right before its landfall on September 3.

While Saola is exhibiting a counter-clockwise loop east of the Philippines, a new broad low-pressure area developed into a tropical depression on August 27, near the Northern Mariana Islands, while slowly drifting westward. On the next day, JMA immediately named the disturbance as Haikui. The JTWC began issuing advisories for Haikui thereafter and designated it as Tropical Depression 10W. Shortly after being named, Haikui rapidly intensified into a severe tropical storm status a few minutes later. It eventually entered PAR, giving the domestic name Hanna.

Before landfall in Taiwan, Haikui strengthened into a Category 3 typhoon due to favorable conditions. Haikui then made landfall, in Taitung County, Taiwan on September 3, became the first typhoon to make landfall in that intensity since Typhoon Megi of 2016. The mountain ranges of Taiwan caused it to weaken to a Category 1 typhoon. It then moved erratically and made its second landfall in Kaohsiung, Taiwan. Haikui weakened significantly and downgraded into a severe tropical storm. On September 5, Haikui made its third and final landfall in Dongshan County, Fujian as a weakening tropical storm. Therefore, JMA and the JTWC made their final advisory as Haikui dissipated on the next day. Overall, Haikui caused 16 deaths and a total of US$2.31 billion worth of damages throughout its lifetime.

Just after Haikui strengthened into a tropical storm, another low-pressure area located far east of Guam began to form. On August 30, as the system steadily intensified, the JTWC started issuing advisories and designated the depression as Tropical Depression 11W. While moving northwest, 11W developed into a tropical storm, giving the name Kirogi. On September 2, Kirogi weakened back to a tropical depression. Its remnants would meander near Japan before dissipating on September 6.

On September 4, an area of low pressure was formed in the northeast region of PAR. The LPA would later be named Ineng by PAGASA and Yun-yeung which replaced the name Kai-tak. Yun-yeung continued to move northward slowly as it approached central and eastern Japan. Yun-yeung was last noted over Suruga Bay near Shizuoka, Japan. It brought heavy rain across the wide areas of Japan, prompting warnings over the risk of flooding and mudslides.

An area of low pressure formed near the Southern Philippines. On September 24, JMA recognized it as a tropical depression as it tracked westward. Around the same day, JTWC designated the system as 13W. It was tracking north-northwestward toward the Vietnam coast. The JMA last tracked the system on September 27.

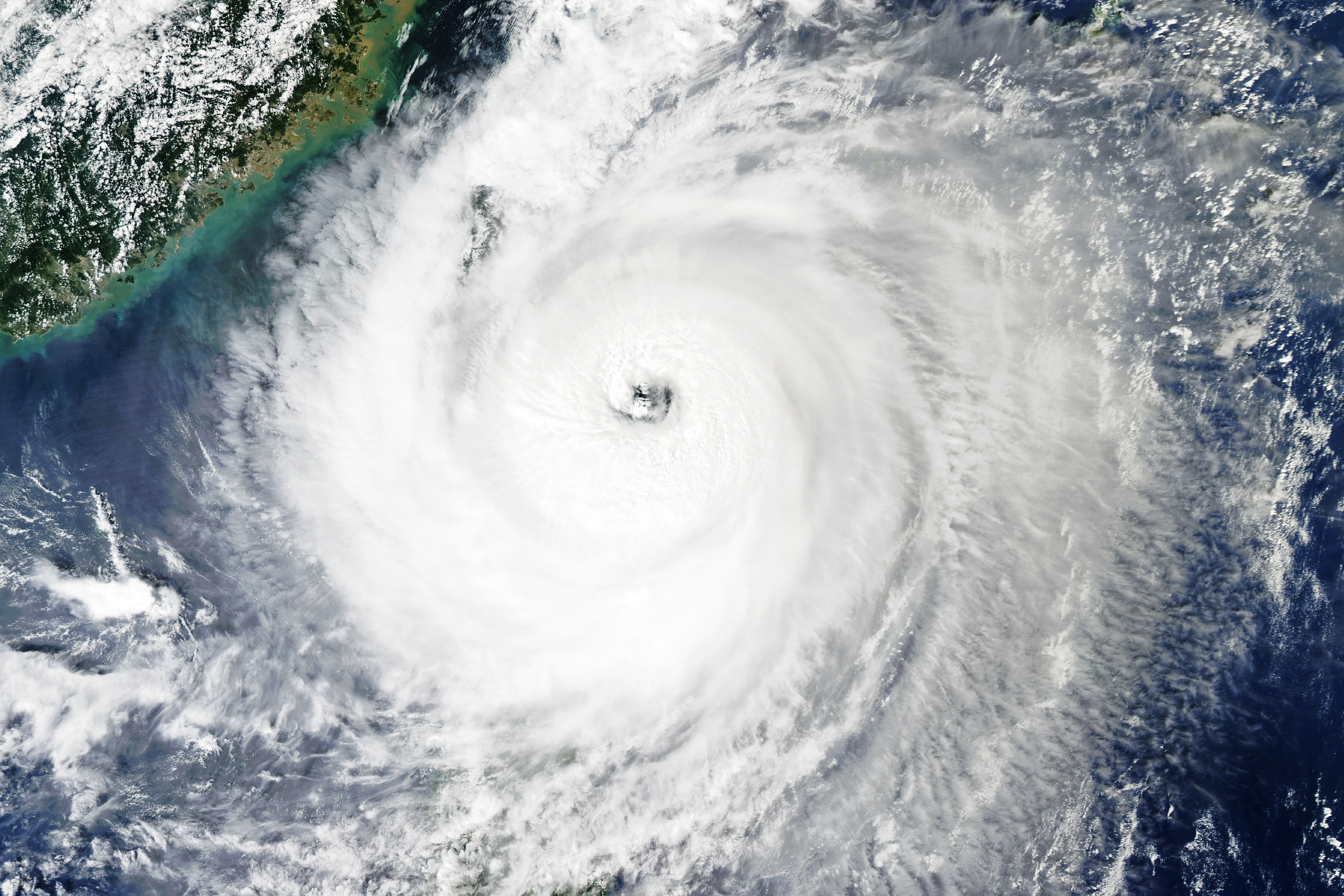
Typhoon Koinu at its peak intensity before making landfall in Lanyu, Taiwan on October 5

On September 27, a low-pressure area was formed near the Northern Mariana Islands. The JTWC later issued bulletins for any potential development in the upcoming days. It continued to move westwards, entering PAR where it was upgraded into a depression and named Jenny by PAGASA. A few hours later, JTWC gave the identifier for Jenny as Tropical Depression 14W. On the next day, JMA upgraded 14W into a tropical storm, assigning the name Koinu. Koinu moved west-northwestward while it intensified steadily. Being in the warm waters of the Philippine Sea, Koinu was upgraded into a Category-3 typhoon.

Koinu weakened into a Category 2 yet it reintensified further into a Category-4 typhoon with 1-minute sustained winds of 220 km/h (140 mph) and a central pressure of 940 hPa (27.76 inHg). This caused Koinu to perform an eyewall replacement cycle, achieving its defined eye-like feature. Koinu then passed dangerously to Lanyu before making its first landfall in Hengchun, Taiwan.

After its interaction with land, Koinu weakened again, downgrading to Category-3 strength. As it left PAR, Koinu further weakened into a Category-1 typhoon. As it tracked through the South China Sea, Koinu unexpectedly restrengthened back to Category-3 major typhoon for the second time. Koinu later passed closely to Hong Kong, which prompted the HKO to issue Increasing Storm Signal No. 9 at 19:00 (HKT). It was kept for 4 hours as it moved away from the country. As it moves through unfavorable conditions, Koinu starts to weaken again for the last time to a tropical storm. JMA and JTWC ceased advisories as Koinu dissipated over the coastal waters of Guangdong on October 10.

=== Late season activity ===
A satellite animation of Typhoon Bolaven during the late morning to early afternoon hours of October 11, 2023

A tropical depression was formed near the Federated States of Micronesia on October 6. The depression later gave its identifier from JTWC as Tropical Depression 15W. Although it was disorganized, the system continued to consolidate, and was upgraded into Tropical Storm Bolaven. On October 10, Bolaven was upgraded into a typhoon. The typhoon passed just south of Saipan and the Northern Mariana Islands. Bolaven later underwent explosive intensification in which it went from a 150 km/h (90 mph) Category 1-equivalent typhoon to a 260 km/h (160 mph) Category 5-equivalent super typhoon in 12 hours ending at 00:00 UTC on October 11, after leaving the Mariana Islands. However, shortly after peaking its intensity, Bolaven later weakened as it recurved northeastward. Bolaven then transitioned into an extratropical cyclone which prompted the JTWC to cease their bulletins.

On October 13, a low-pressure area developed to the west of the Philippines. Due to the system being over warm waters and low vertical wind shear, a TCFA was announced on October 16. JTWC designated the said disturbance as 16W. On October 18, JMA formally named the system Tropical Storm Sanba as it continues to consolidate. Sanba later made landfall in Hainan on the following day. It weakened into a tropical depression on October 20.

After many weeks of inactivity, a tropical depression was formed on November 12. Shortly after, the JTWC issued a TCFA for what was then-Invest 95W. At 15:00 UTC, the agency designated it as 17W. The system was expected to develop into a tropical cyclone but was hindered by easterly wind shear and dry air. On the following day, the JTWC noted that 17W had been dissipated due to the presence of high wind shear as it headed towards the equator.

A satellite animation of Tropical Storm Jelawat weakening after crossing Mindanao on December 18

The last tropical cyclone of 2023 was formed east-southeast of Yap on December 13. Conditions for further development remained marginally conductive with sea surface temperatures of 30–31 °C (86–88 °F) and low vertical wind shear. The next day, it entered PAR, which gained the name Kabayan. On December 17, the system intensified into a tropical storm, and attained the name Jelawat. At 09:30 PHT (01:30 UTC) the next day, Jelawat made landfall in Manay, Davao Oriental, weakening into a tropical depression. JTWC later issued its last bulletin on Jelawat, stating that land interaction and lack of humidity had made the depression rapidly weaken.

However, on December 20, JMA and JTWC monitored the remnants of the system, stating that it was marginal to regenerate. The JMA continued to observe the remnants until 18:00 UTC. The JTWC remained monitoring the remnants until they formally dissipated on December 22. Jelawat's passage through the Philippines caused heavy rainfall across Mindanao and Visayas. One person went missing while the other one got injured. Jelawat caused $43,200 thousand worth of damages throughout its onslaught.

== Systems ==
=== Tropical Depression Amang ===
- Tropical depression (JMA)
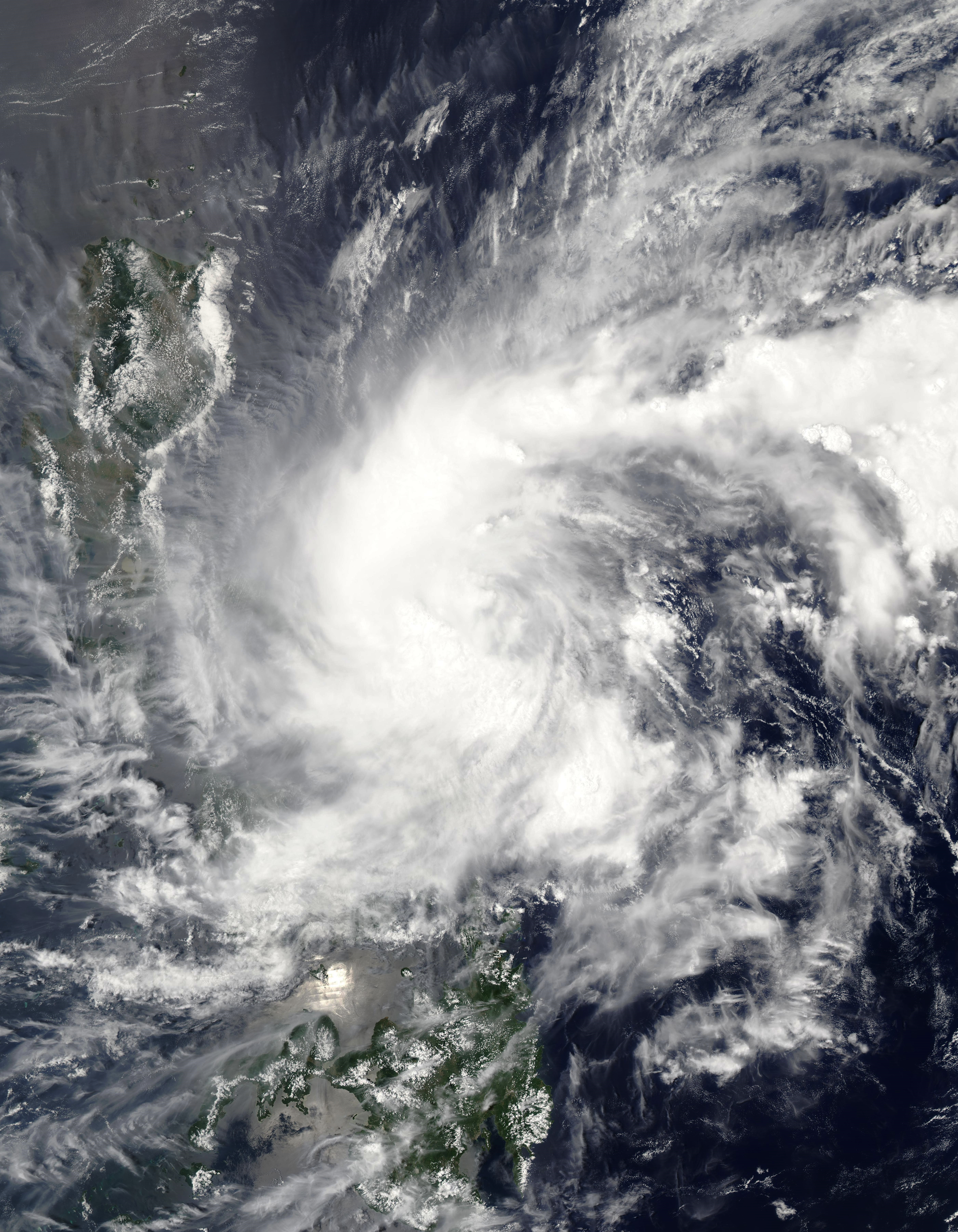
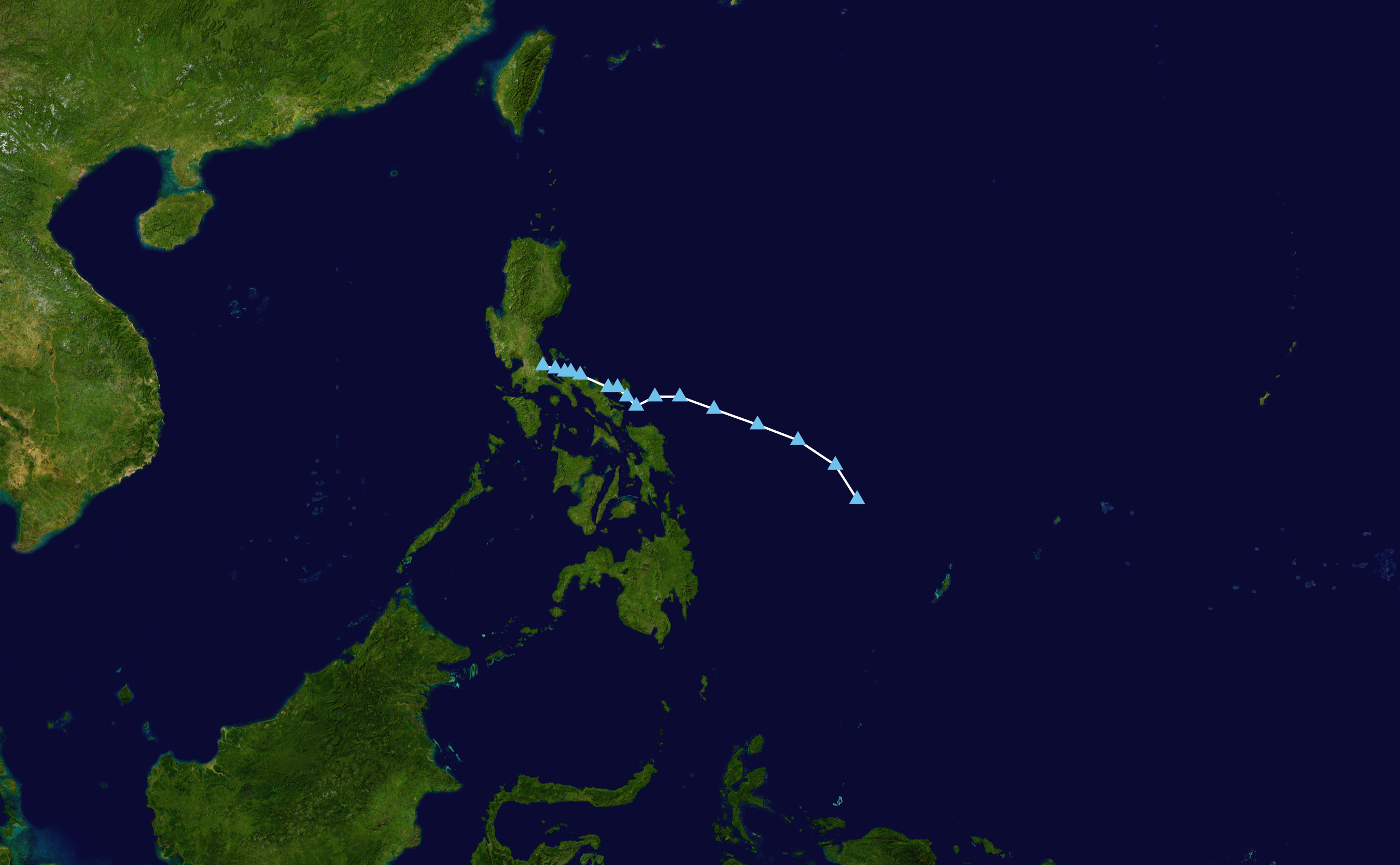
- Duration: April 10 – April 13
- Peak intensity: 55 km/h (35 mph) (10-min); 1004 hPa (mbar)

On April 7, the JMA began to monitor a low-pressure area in the Philippine Sea. A strong convection to the north of the system's low-level circulation center (LLCC) prompted the JTWC to issue a Tropical Cyclone Formation Alert (TCFA) on the disturbance as it tracked west-northwestwards into a favorable environment for further development. Later that day, the JMA and the PAGASA classified the storm as a tropical depression. As the storm formed within the Philippine Area of Responsibility (PAR), the depression received the name Amang.

Amang made its first landfall over Panganiban, Catanduanes around 23:00 PHT (15:00 UTC) on April 11. Later the next day, the PAGASA reported that Amang had made a second landfall in Presentacion, Camarines Sur and later made its third landfall in Lagonoy, Camarines Sur. Upon land interaction, the JTWC canceled its TCFA, stating that Amang was in an unfavorable environment which had dry air and wind shear. PAGASA would issue its last advisory on Amang, downgraded the storm to a remnant low on April 13.

Agricultural damages caused by the storm were estimated at ₱50.84 million (US$923 thousand), affecting 1,569 farmers and 1,330 ha (3,300 acres) of land. 1,918 passengers were stranded in the Bicol Region following sea travel suspensions. On April 13, classes up to senior high school in 19 areas were suspended due to bad weather, along with pre-elementary classes in areas under Signal No. 1. Five people were killed.

=== Tropical Storm Sanvu ===
- Tropical storm (JMA)
- Tropical storm (SSHWS)
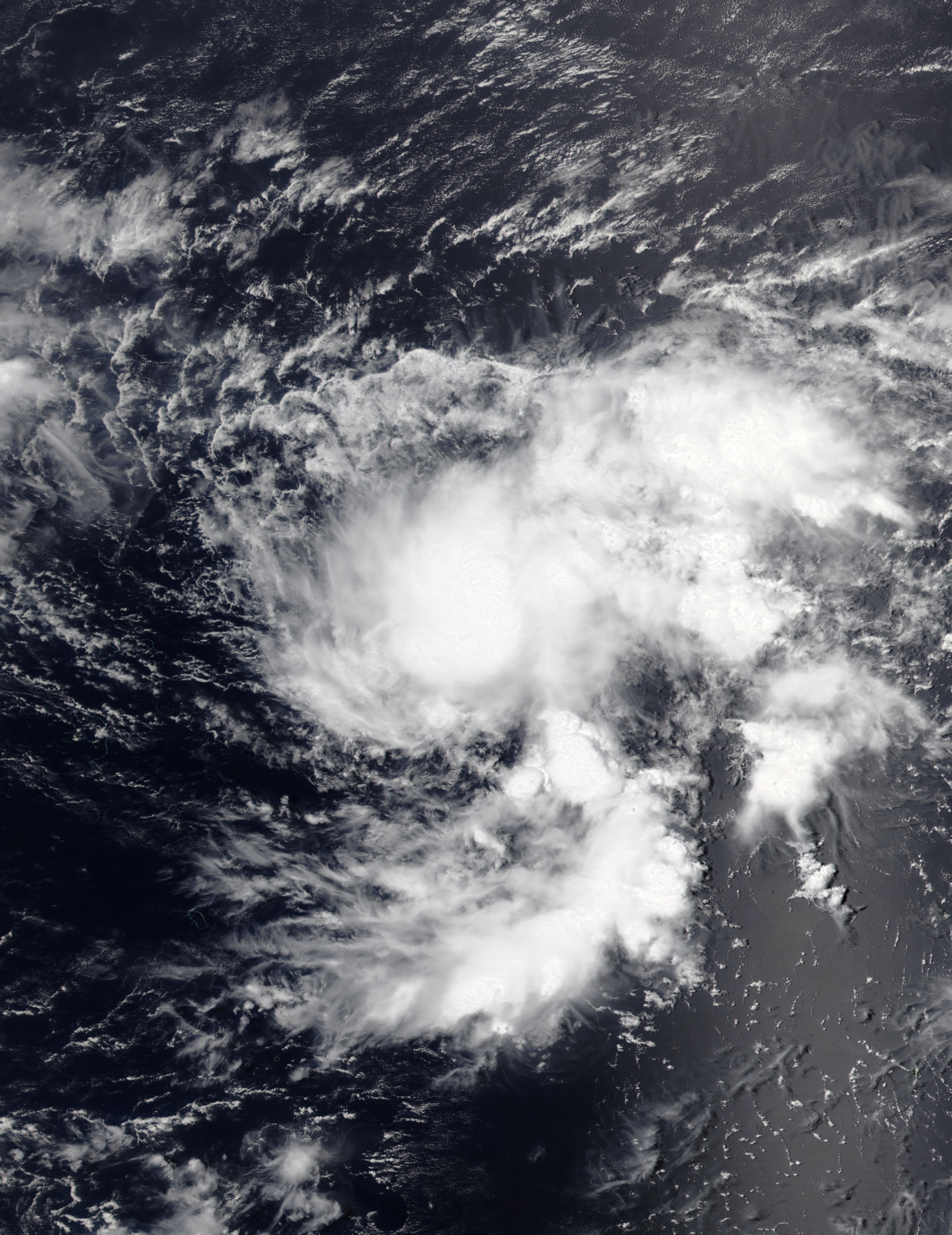
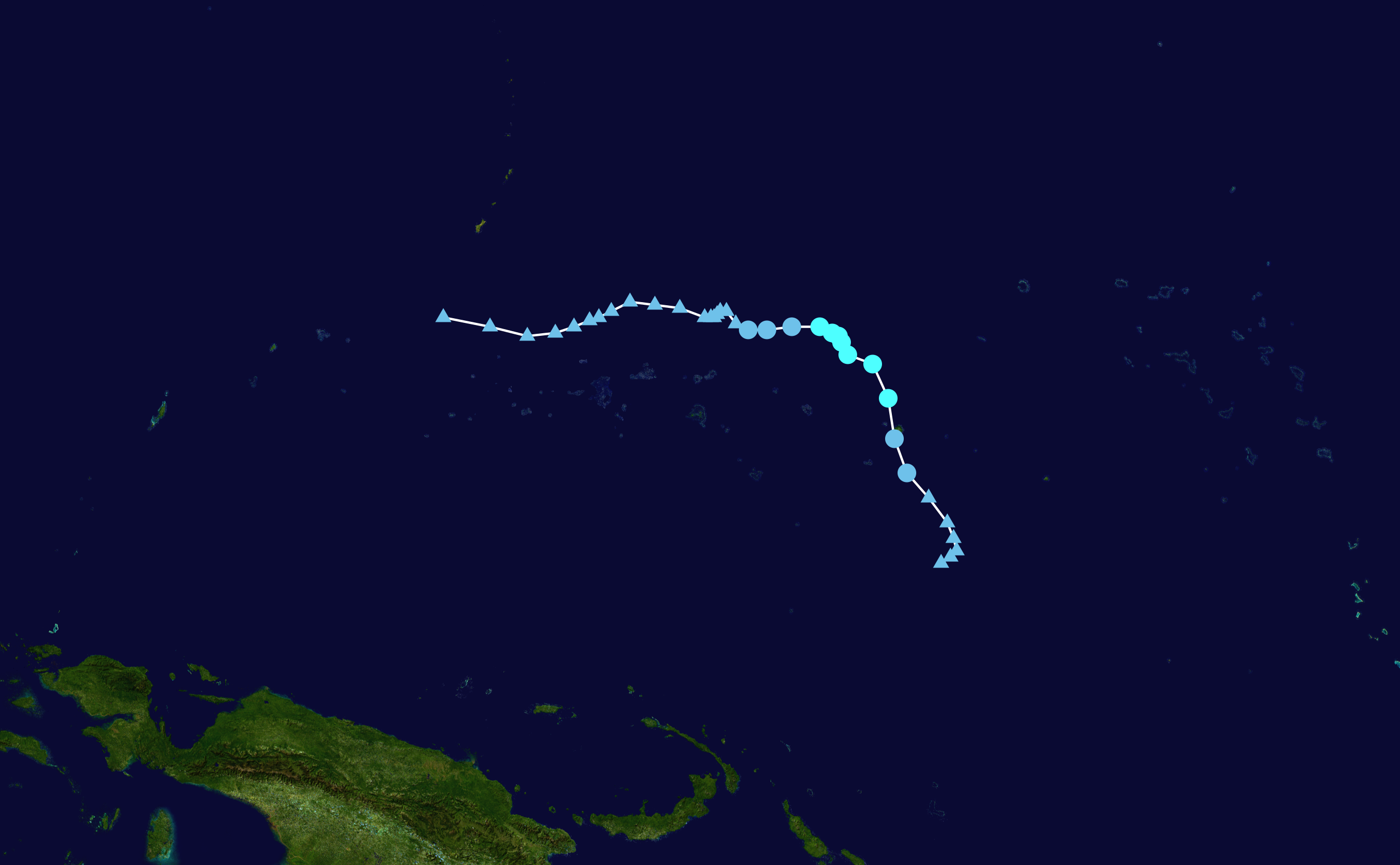
- Duration: April 19 – April 22
- Peak intensity: 85 km/h (50 mph) (10-min); 996 hPa (mbar)

An area of convection monitored by the JTWC spawned south-southeast of Pohnpei on April 18. The JMA later classified the disturbance as a tropical depression the following day, before the JTWC followed suit and designated the system 01W. On April 20, the depression further intensified to a tropical storm, according to the JTWC, after convection and rainbands strengthened over the LLCC. The JMA subsequently upgraded its status by 6:00 UTC, and gave the name Sanvu to the storm.

After reaching its peak intensity early on April 21, Sanvu began to weaken afterward due to clusters of convection on its northeast quadrant absorbing its energy. By April 22, Sanvu's poor, ragged structure of its circulation center prompted the JTWC to cease issuing bulletins on the storm as it was downgraded to a tropical depression. The JMA cancelled advisories on the storm the same day as well. The JMA tracked the system until 00:00 UTC of April 25. The JTWC reported that Sanvu's remnants had dissipated on April 26.

=== Typhoon Mawar (Betty) ===
- Violent typhoon (JMA)
- Category 5 super typhoon (SSHWS)
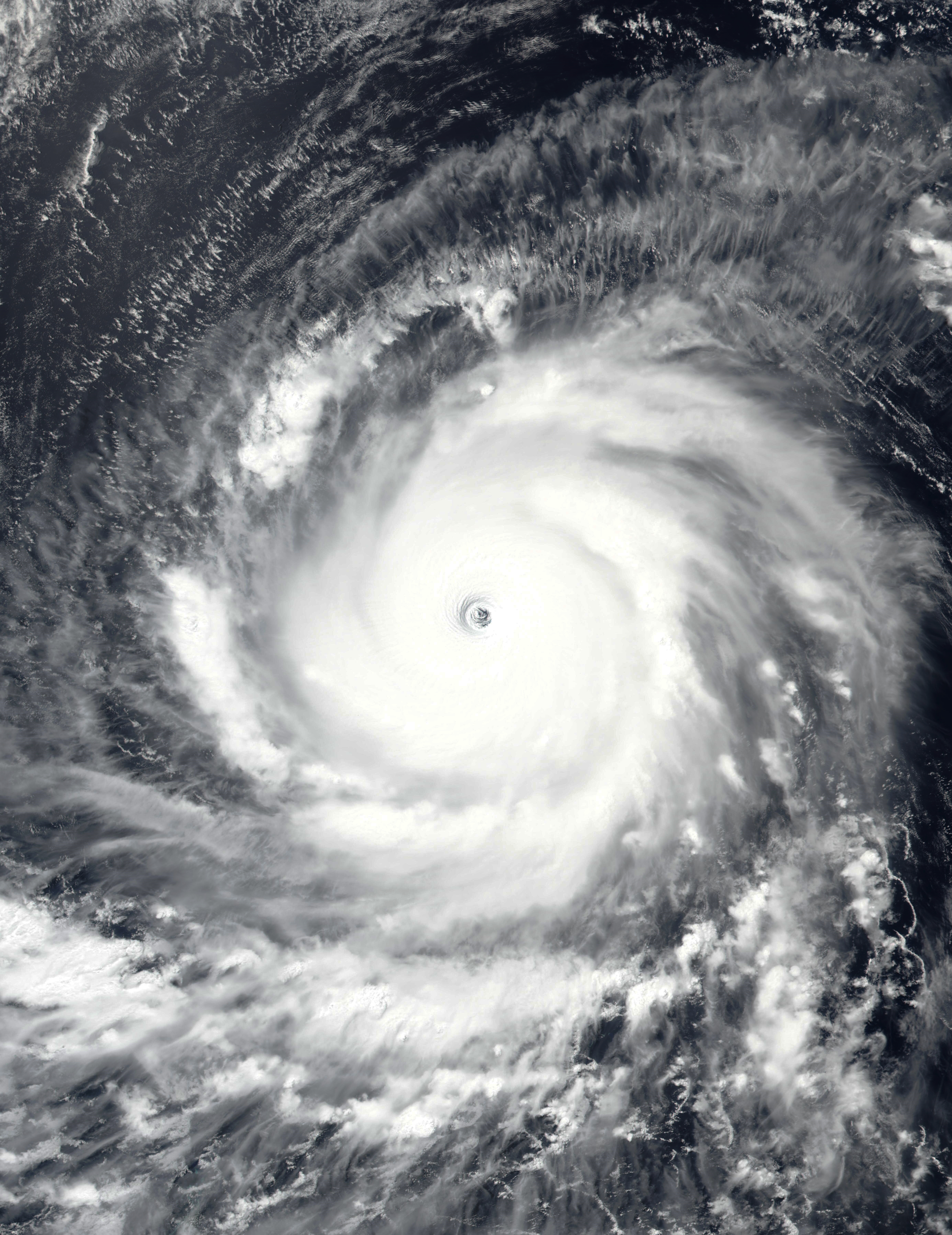
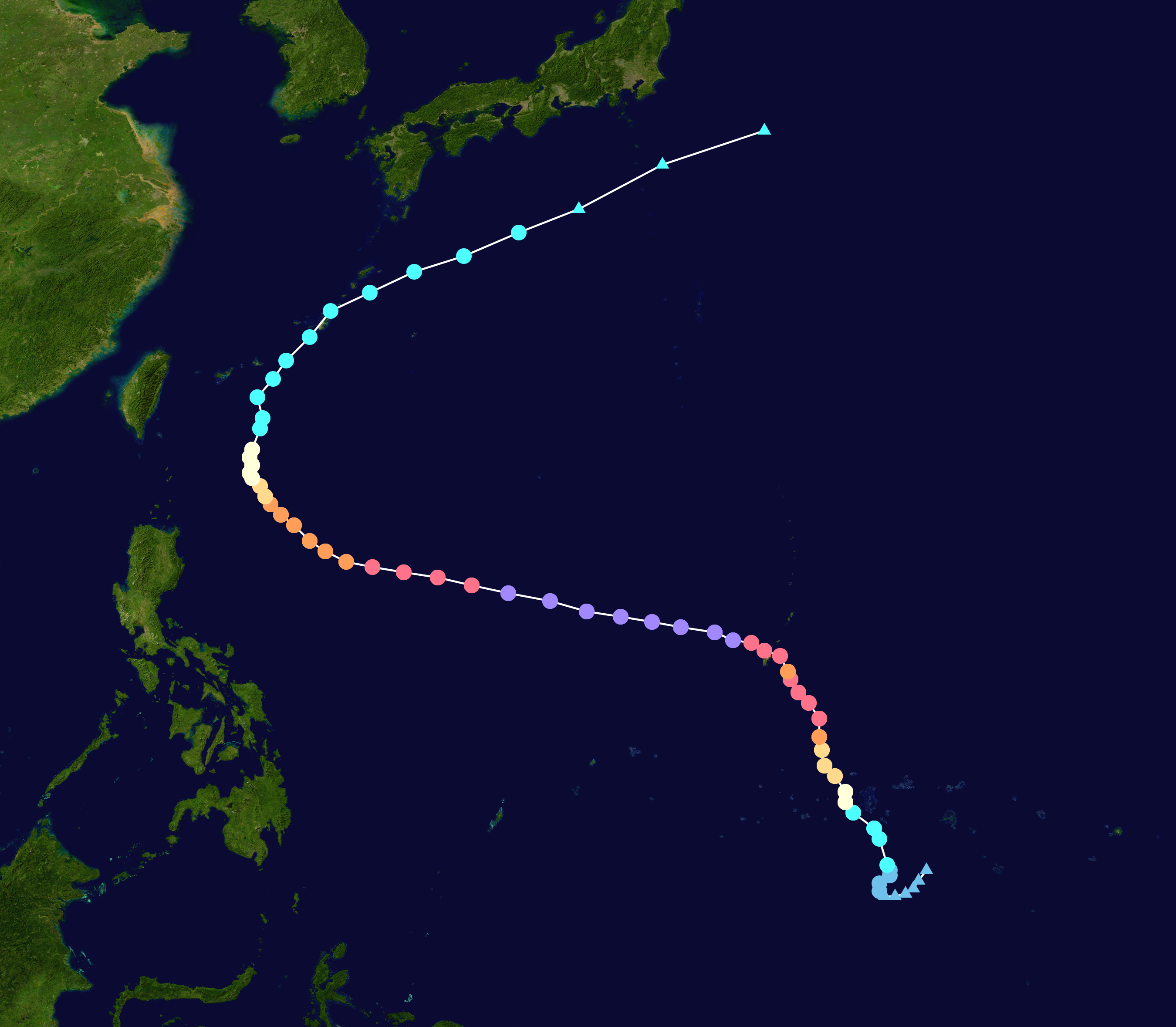
- Duration: May 19 – June 2
- Peak intensity: 215 km/h (130 mph) (10-min); 900 hPa (mbar)

On May 17, a weak LLCC located 865 km (535 mi) south of Guam was marked by the JTWC. Thunderstorms around the LLCC soon became very wide and organization had improved, before the JMA upgraded the system to a tropical depression on May 19. JTWC later designated the depression as 02W. The same day, the depression became a tropical storm, receiving the name Mawar. The JMA further upgraded the storm to severe tropical storm status at 00:00 UTC of May 21, as the deep convection in the central dense overcast (CDO) completely obscured the LLCC. Mawar later became a typhoon on the same day. Mawar further became a super typhoon and underwent an eyewall replacement cycle. During May 24, the center of Mawar passed through the northern tip of Guam, and slightly weakened. After passing north of and impacting Guam, Mawar later restrengthen and became a Category 5-equivalent super typhoon, attaining 1-minute sustained winds of 305 km/h (190 mph). It then entered PAR, which PAGASA assigned the local name Betty. Mawar slightly weakened moving around the southwestern edge of the subtropical high, with JMA downgraded the system into severe tropical storm status. Mawar further downgraded into a tropical storm as it approached Okinawa. On June 3, Mawar transitioned into an extratropical cyclone south of Honshu, as it moved towards the open Pacific.

Power outages began affecting parts of Guam on May 22 as winds from Mawar intensified. Guam International Airport also recorded winds up to 104.7 miles per hour (168.5 km/h) as Mawar impacted the island. Mawar passed north of the island as a Category 4-equivalent typhoon on May 24, bringing hurricane-force winds and heavy rain marking as the strongest storm to affect the island since Typhoon Pongsona in 2002.

=== Typhoon Guchol (Chedeng) ===
- Typhoon (JMA)
- Category 2 typhoon (SSHWS)
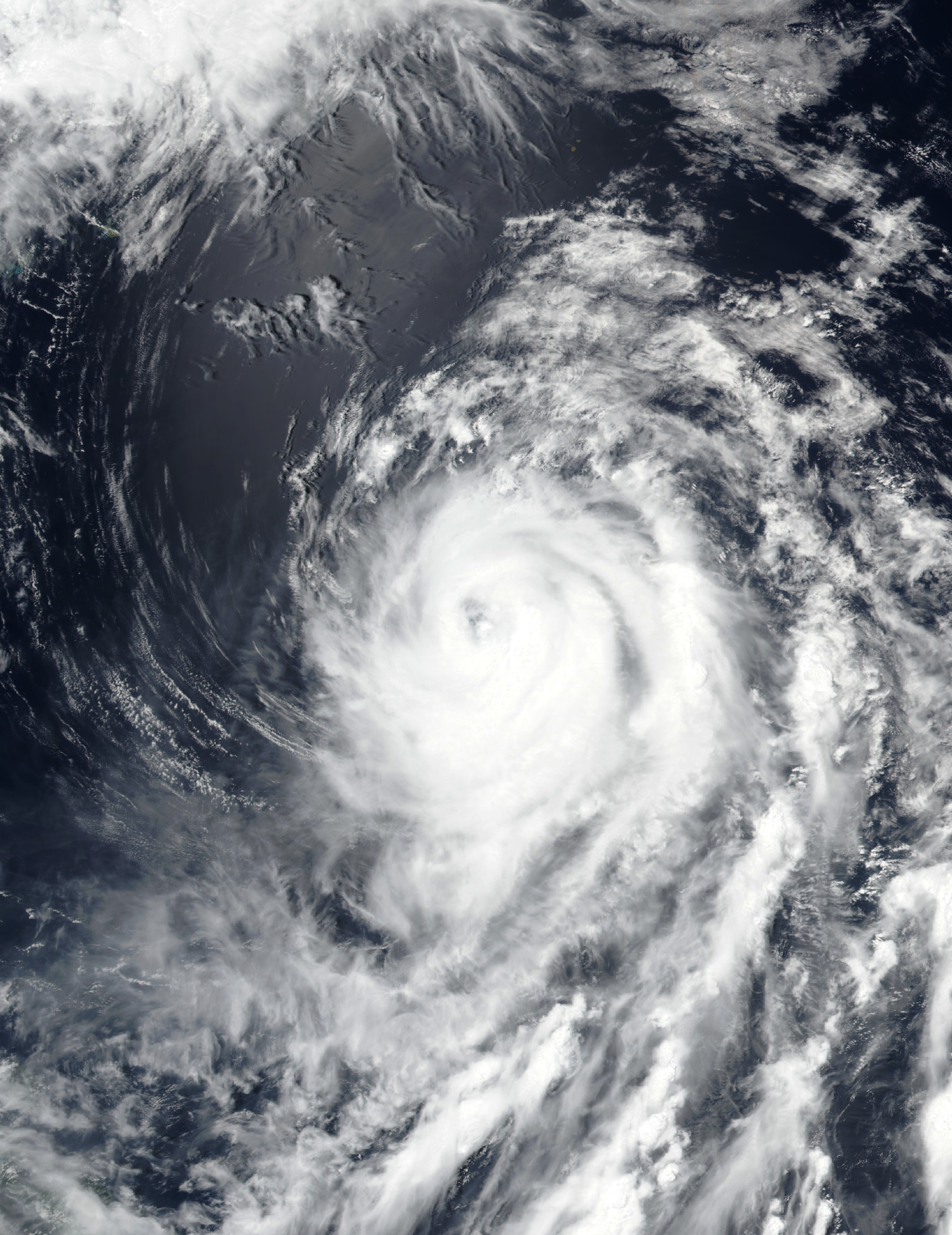
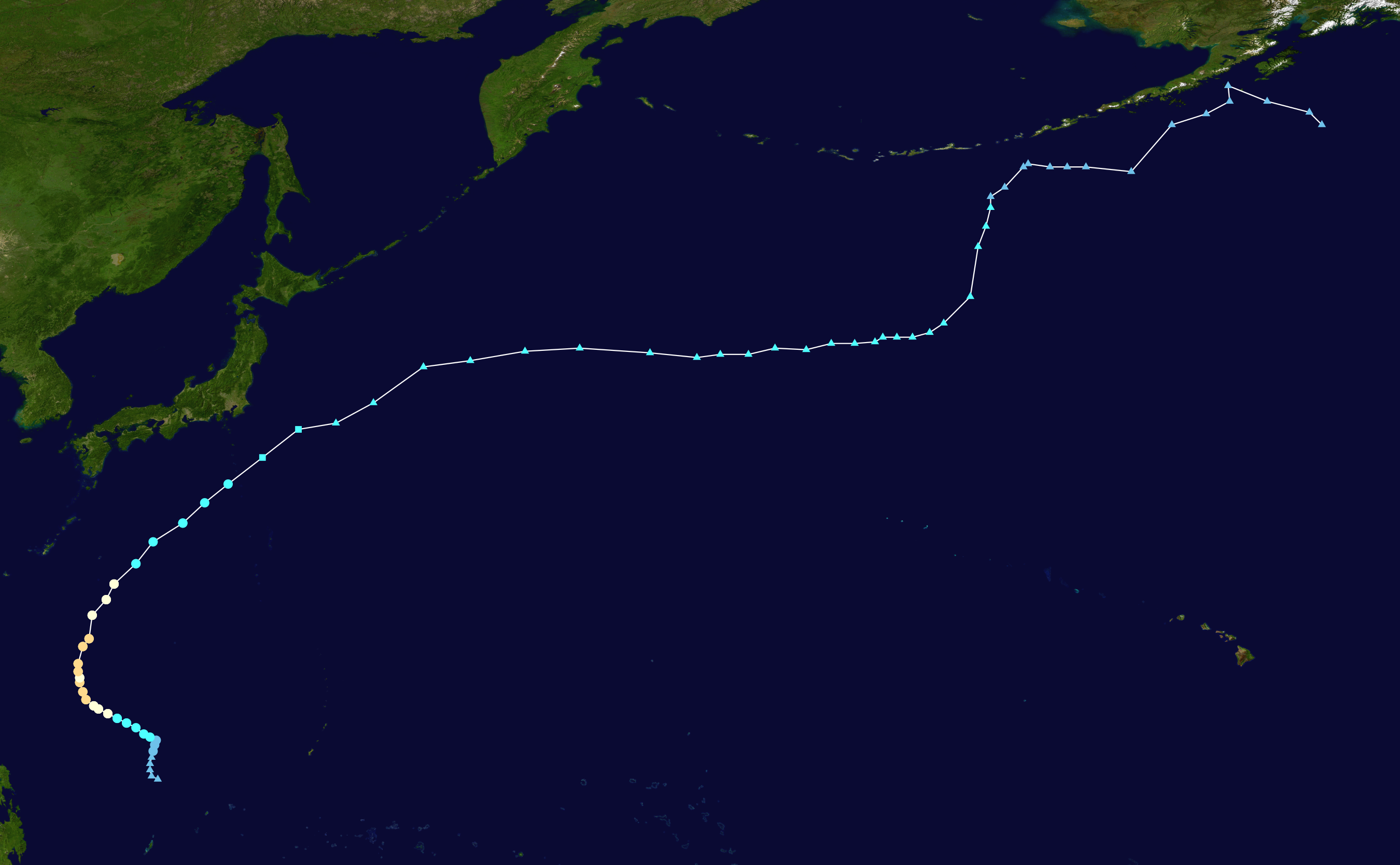
- Duration: June 6 – June 12
- Peak intensity: 150 km/h (90 mph) (10-min); 960 hPa (mbar)

In the first weeks of June, a low-pressure area formed north of Palau, with the JTWC designating the system as Invest 98W, for a potential tropical cyclone development. JTWC later issued a Tropical Cyclone Formation Alert regarding with the system. The low-pressure area north of Palau then developed into a tropical depression late on June 5. At the following day, it intensified and entered the Philippine Area of Responsibility, prompting the PAGASA to name it as Chedeng at 08:00 UTC. The JTWC later followed suit and designated it as 03W, when the system had possessed nascent bands spiraling in all quadrants. At 20:00 UTC, Chedeng was upgraded into a tropical storm, attaining the name Guchol. Guchol slightly intensified and later became a strong Category 2 typhoon in the Philippine Sea with its peak intensity of 10-minute sustained winds of 150 km/h (90 mph), but the cold wake from Typhoon Mawar kept it from intensifying any further. As Guchol (Chedeng) exited the PAR, it weakened into a severe tropical storm, and continued northeastwards, avoiding the Japanese archipelago. It then became extratropical on June 12.

Guchol had minimal impact. However, it enhanced the southwest monsoon during its presence inside the PAR, resulting in widespread heavy rains over the western portions of Luzon.

=== Severe Tropical Storm Talim (Dodong) ===
- Severe tropical storm (JMA)
- Category 1 typhoon (SSHWS)
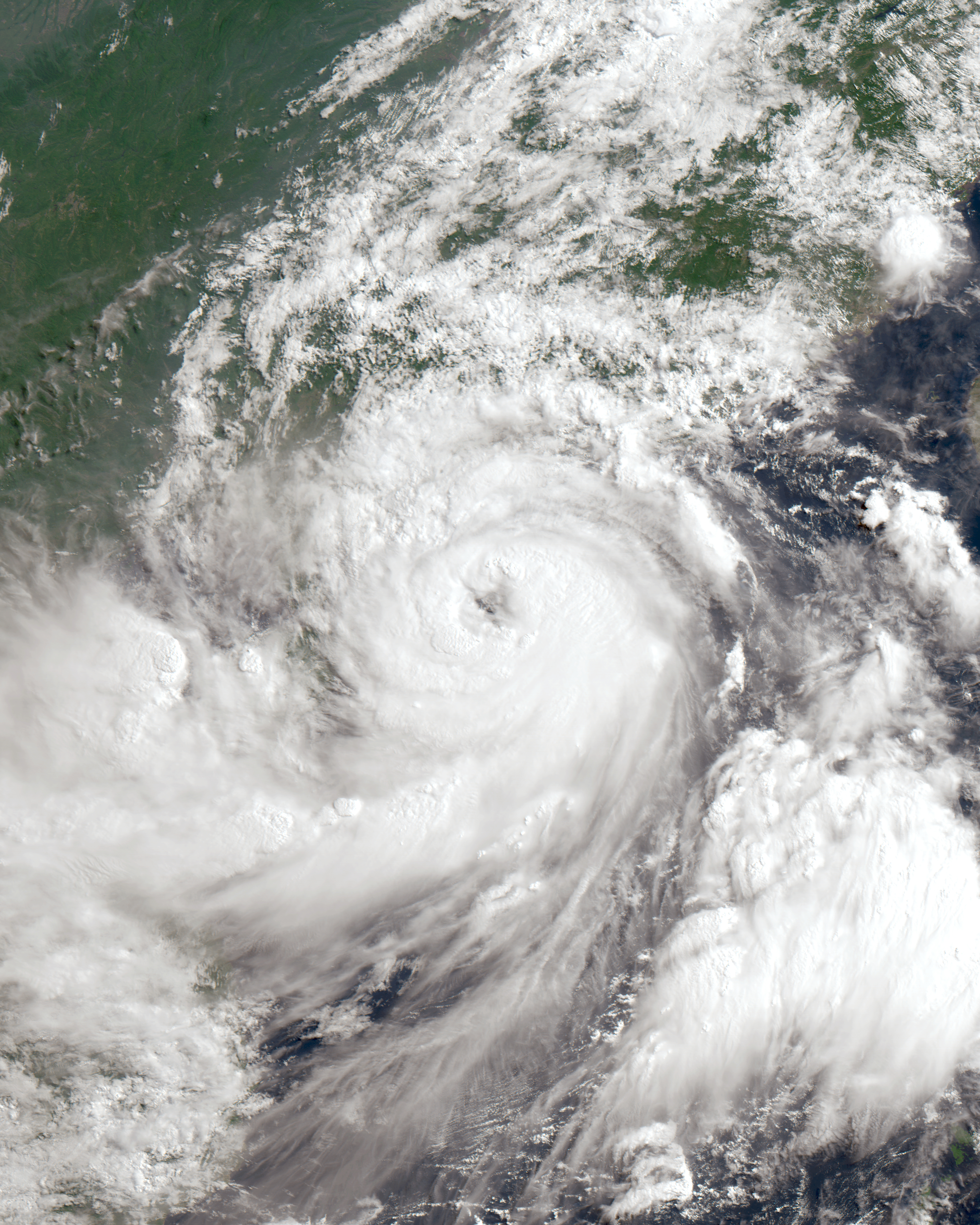
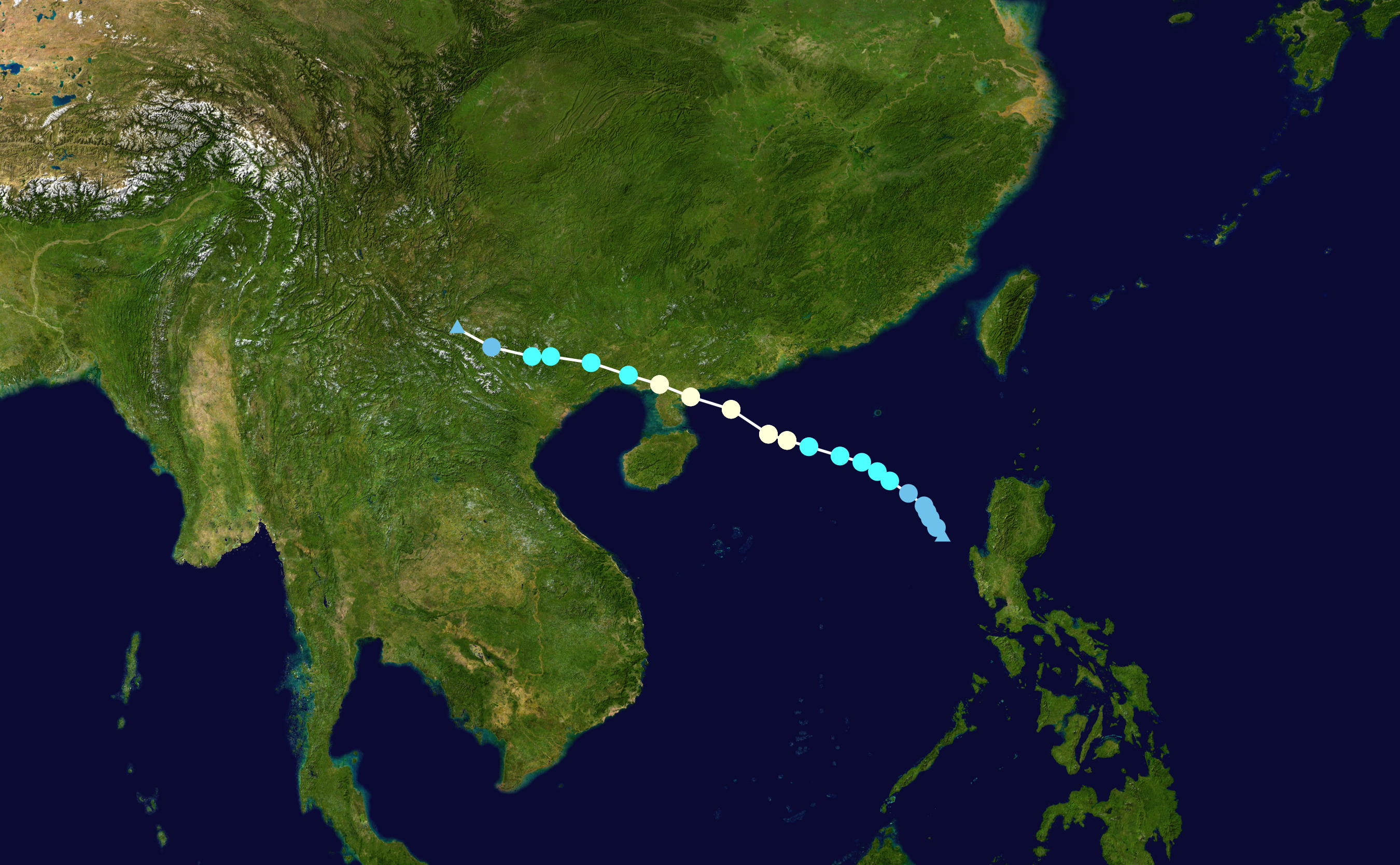
- Duration: July 13 – July 18
- Peak intensity: 110 km/h (70 mph) (10-min); 970 hPa (mbar)

On July 12, a low-pressure area formed off the coast of Aurora, Philippines. The JMA later classified it as a tropical depression. PAGASA named it Dodong as it entered the Philippine Area of Responsibility. The system made landfall in Dinapigue, Aurora, and crossed over Cagayan and Isabela. JTWC later designated it as 04W. Upon exiting the PAR, the JMA upgraded it to Tropical Storm Talim. Talim featured a broad LLCC with deep convection over its western and southern quadrants. It continued to intensify over the South China Sea, becoming a severe tropical storm in favorable conditions with strong equatorward outflow. JTWC later upgraded it to a Category 2-equivalent typhoon with winds of 85 kn (155 km/h; 100 mph). On July 17, Talim made landfall in Zhanjiang, Guangdong with winds of 136 km/h (85 mph), then rapidly weakened inland. JTWC discontinued advisories soon after, and the system dissipated the next day.

Talim enhanced the East Asian Monsoon, bringing heavy rain and gusts across Luzon. Classes were suspended in three cities and parts of Cagayan. The NDRRMC estimated ₱298.7 million (US$5.74 million) in damages, ₱198.7 million in agriculture and ₱100 million in infrastructure. The storm was responsible for 3 fatalities. In Vietnam, Talim also caused over ₫20.7 billion (US$874,782) in property damage.

=== Typhoon Doksuri (Egay) ===
- Very strong typhoon (JMA)
- Category 4 super typhoon (SSHWS)
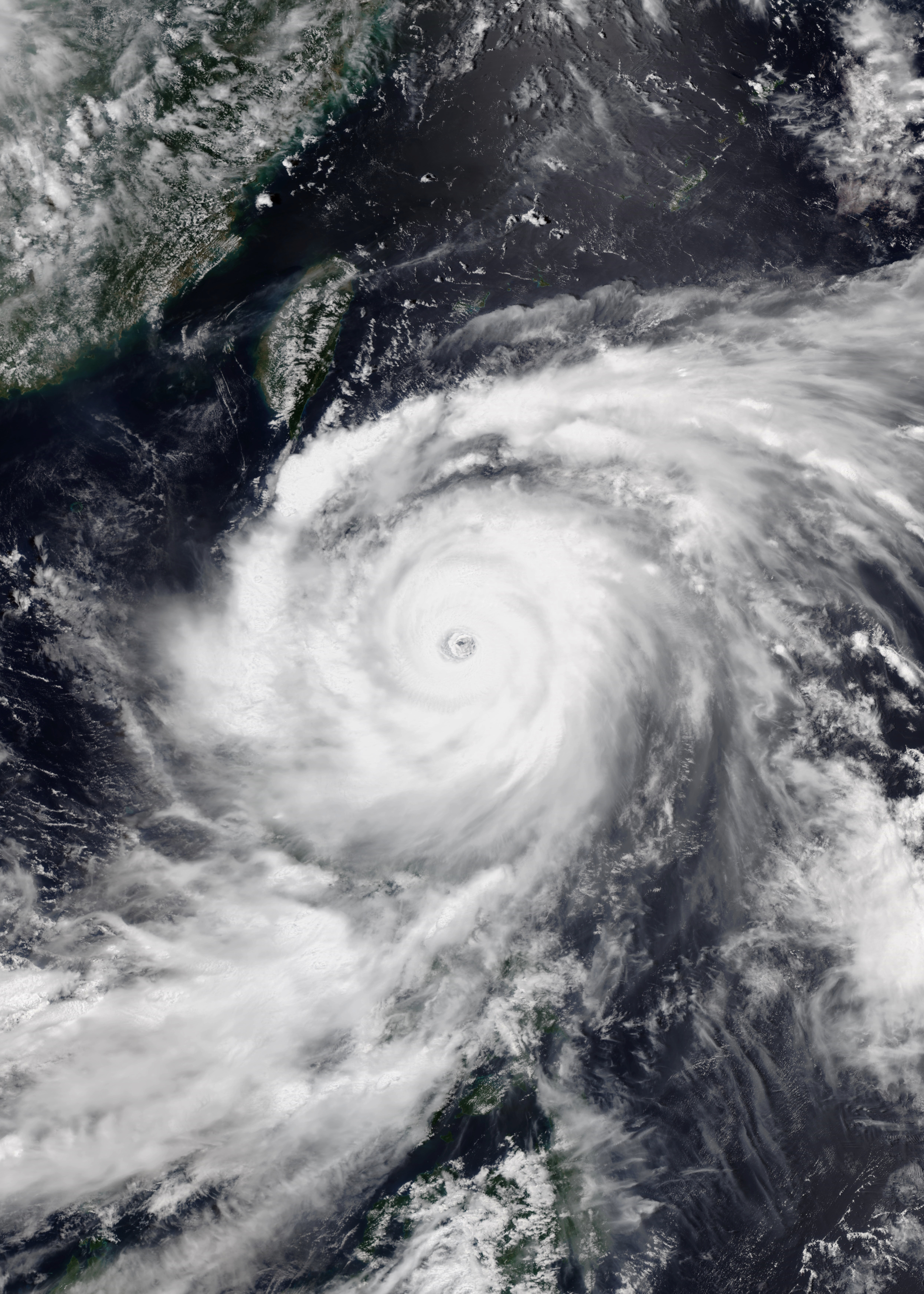
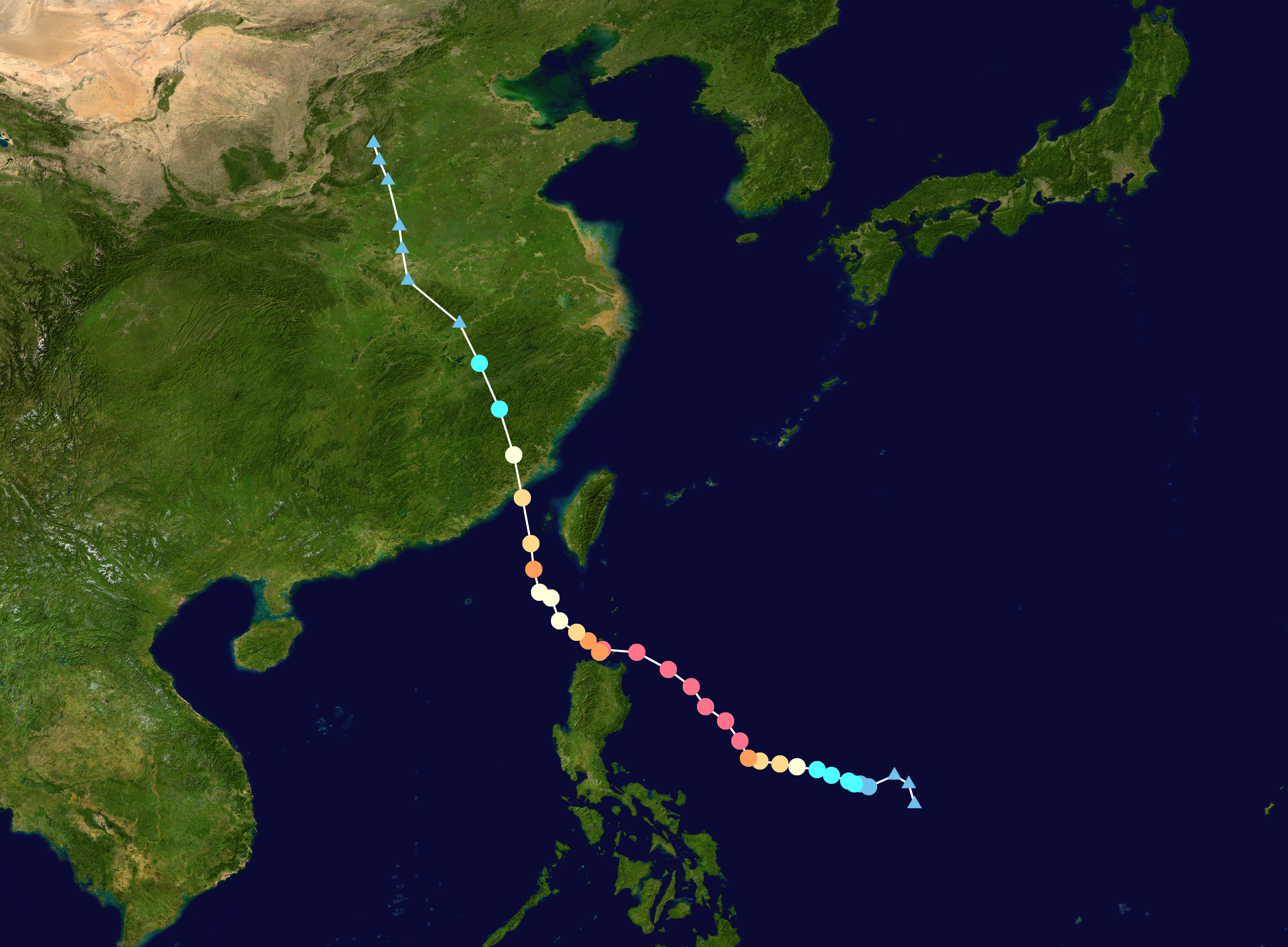
- Duration: July 20 – July 30
- Peak intensity: 185 km/h (115 mph) (10-min); 925 hPa (mbar)

On July 19, the JMA began tracking a low-pressure area east of Mindanao in the Philippine Sea. By July 20, it developed into a tropical depression, prompting the JTWC to issue a TCFA later that day. On July 21, it intensified into Tropical Storm Doksuri, locally named Egay by PAGASA. JTWC began issuing advisories and designated it as 05W. Doksuri gradually strengthened as it moved northwestward. By July 23 at 12:00 UTC, Doksuri rapidly intensified into a super typhoon over the Philippine Sea. Crossing northern Philippines on July 25–26, it weakened to a typhoon and made landfalls on Camiguin Island, Fuga Island in Aparri, Cagayan, and Dalupiri Island. Doksuri exited the PAR around 10:00 PHT (02:00 UTC) on July 27. It then rapidly intensified again, forming a pinhole eye. On July 28, it made its final landfall in Jinjiang, Fujian with sustained winds of 180 km/h (50 m/s), and weakened inland before dissipating.

The typhoon caused 137 deaths, 46 missing, and 285 injuries, including 27 who died when the MB Aya Express capsized. Damages across affected countries totaled $28.4 billion. The old Quirino Bridge in Bantay, Ilocos Sur was also severely damaged by floodwaters from the Abra River, submerging the "ONE ILOCOS SUR" inscription.

=== Typhoon Khanun (Falcon) ===
- Very strong typhoon (JMA)
- Category 4 typhoon (SSHWS)
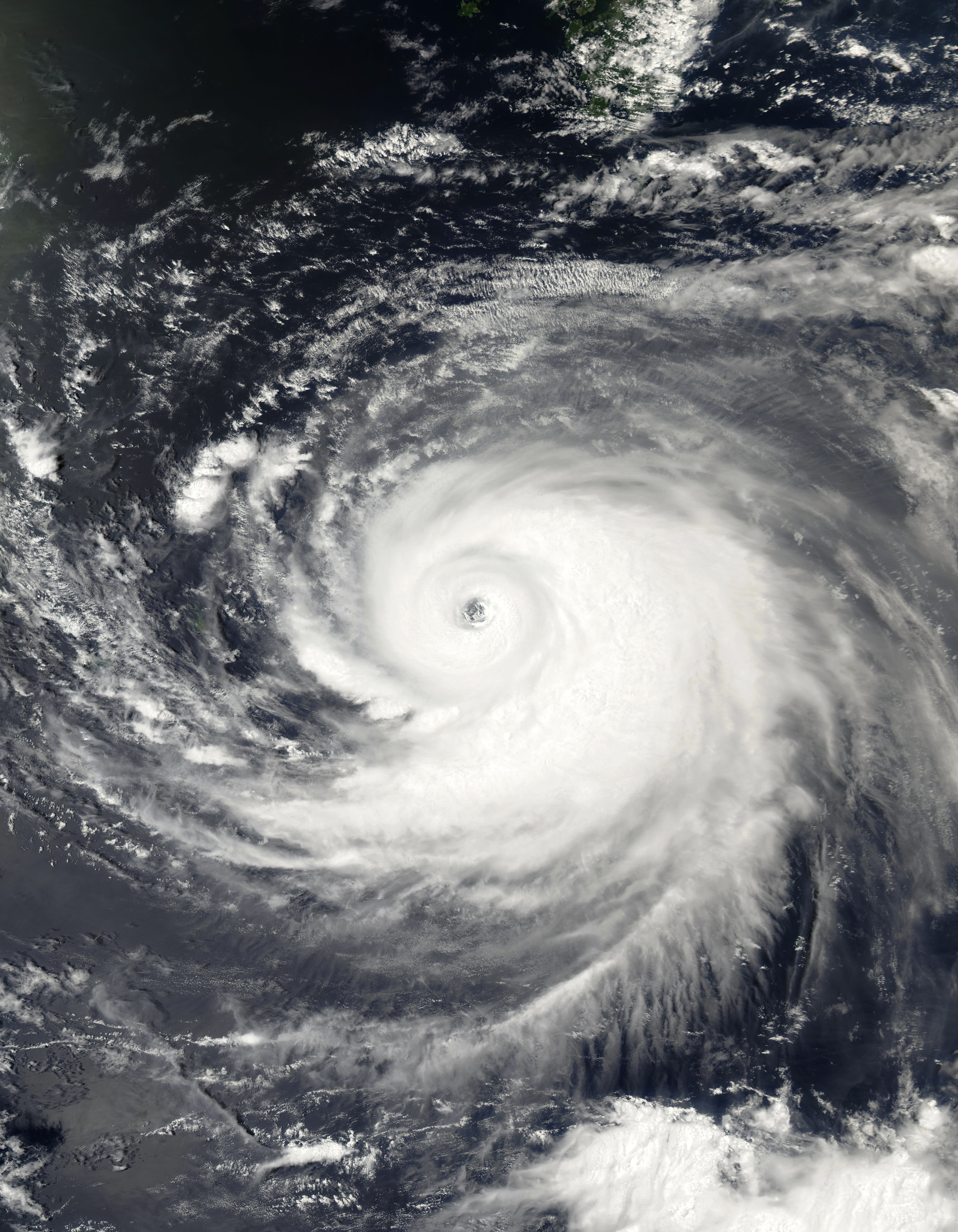
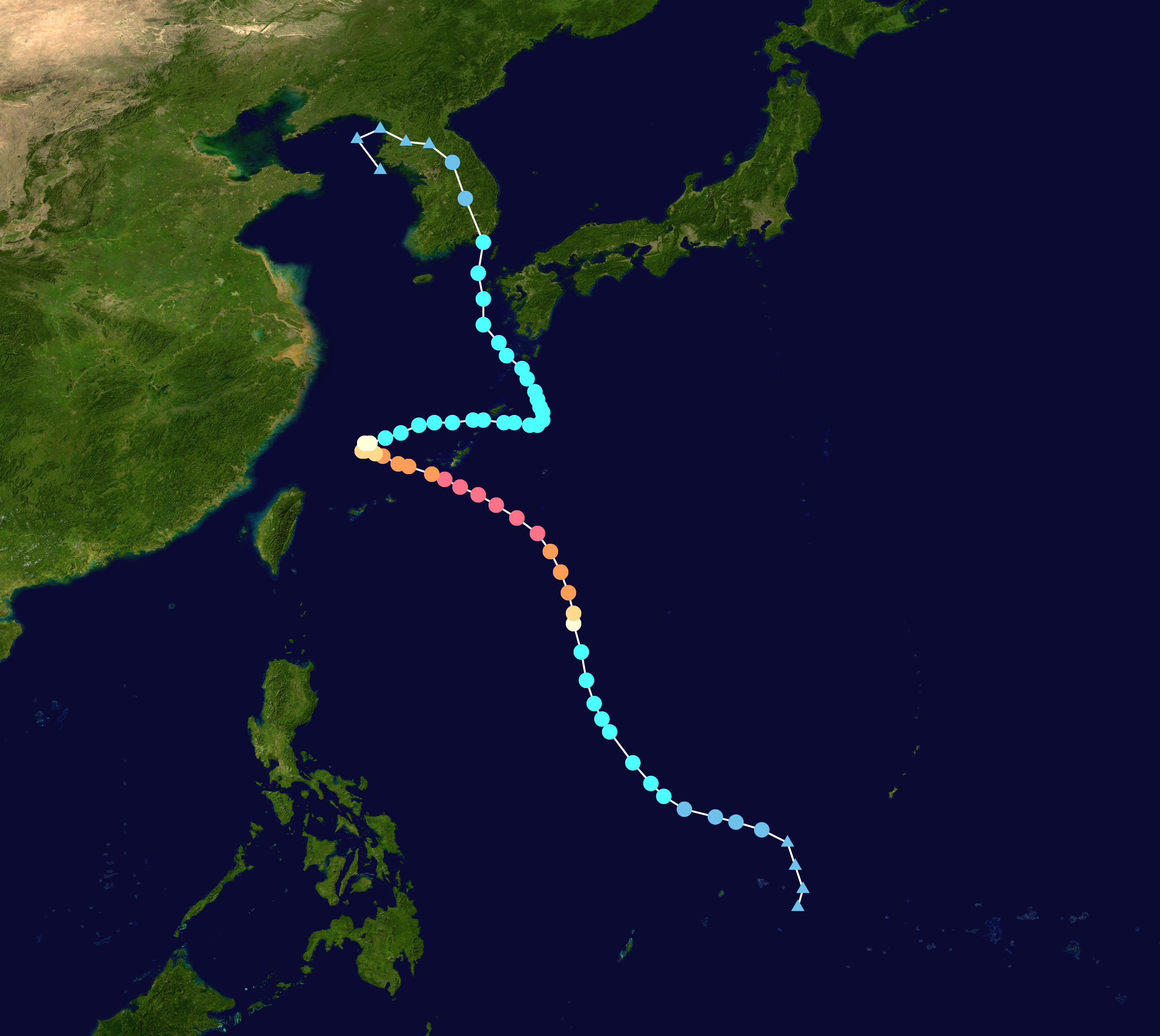
- Duration: July 26 – August 10
- Peak intensity: 175 km/h (110 mph) (10-min); 930 hPa (mbar)

On July 26, the JMA reported the formation of a low-pressure area in the Pacific Ocean and upgraded it to a tropical depression later that day. The system developed in favorable conditions, including warm sea surface temperatures and low vertical wind shear. Both the JMA and JTWC upgraded it to Tropical Storm Khanun, and the JMA assigned the name. The JTWC designated it as 06W. Khanun showed signs of strengthening with a consolidating LLCC and deep convection over its eastern semicircle. It entered the PAR at 03:00 UTC (11:00 PHT) on July 29 and was named Falcon by PAGASA. Within 24 hours, it intensified from 50 kn (93 km/h; 58 mph) to 120 kn (220 km/h; 140 mph), reaching Category 4 on the Saffir–Simpson scale. Khanun exited the PAR around 03:00 PHT (19:00 UTC) on August 1. Satellite data later showed continued consolidation with deep convection over its northern semicircle. Around 00:00 UTC on August 10, Khanun made landfall over Geojedo, South Korea, with winds of 45 kn (83 km/h; 52 mph). The JMA ceased tracking the system early on August 11.

As of August 18, Khanun left 13 dead, 16 missing, and at least 115 injured. Damages reached US$126 million. Power outages affected at least 160,000 homes. Khanun was the first typhoon on record to cross the entire Korean Peninsula from south to north since 1951. North Korea's KCTV reported rainfall up to 181 mm (7.1 in) and winds exceeding 18 km/h (11 mph) in Kangwon Province. Although it did not directly impact the Philippines, Khanun and Doksuri enhanced the southwest monsoon, causing widespread flooding.

=== Typhoon Lan ===
- Very strong typhoon (JMA)
- Category 4 typhoon (SSHWS)
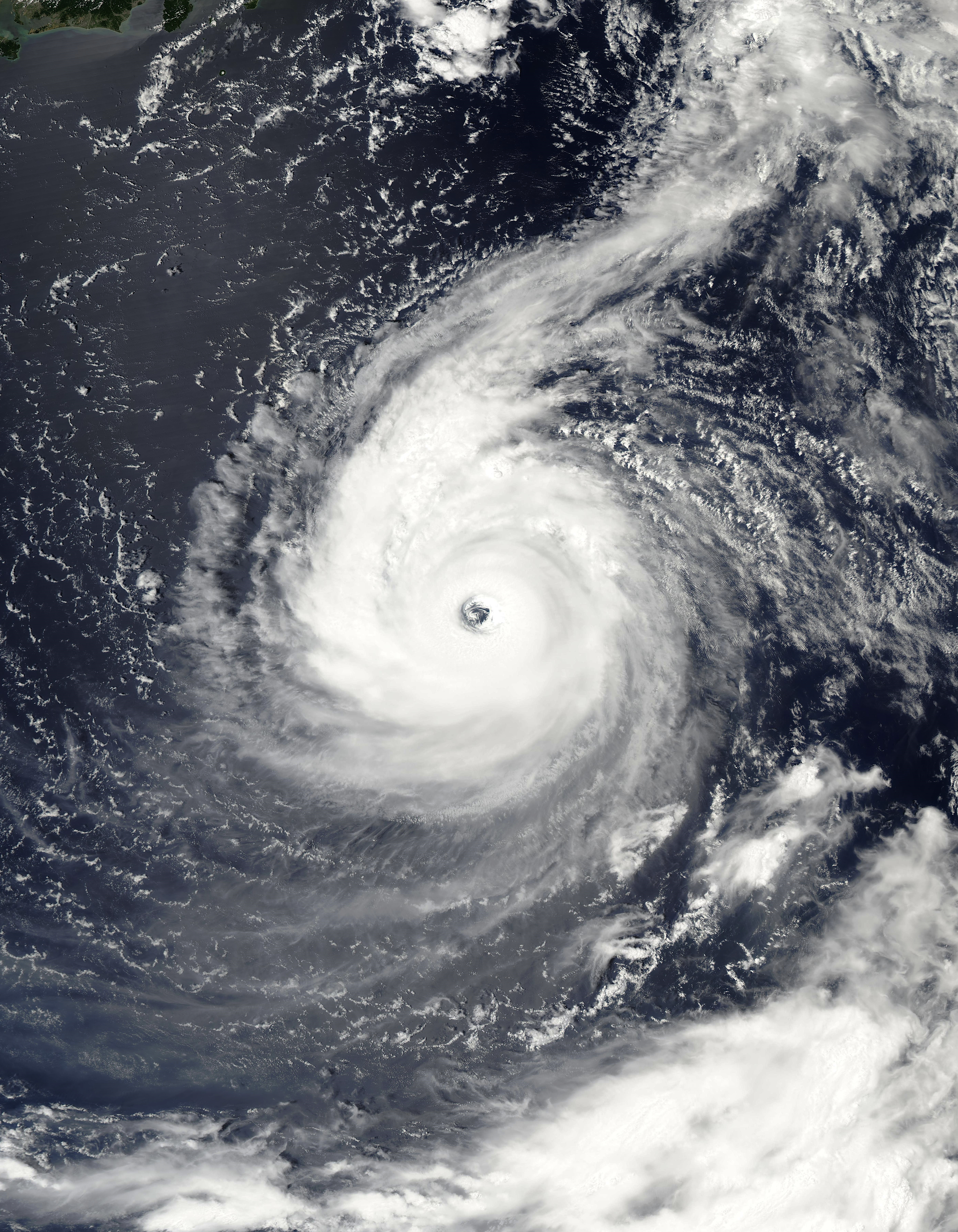
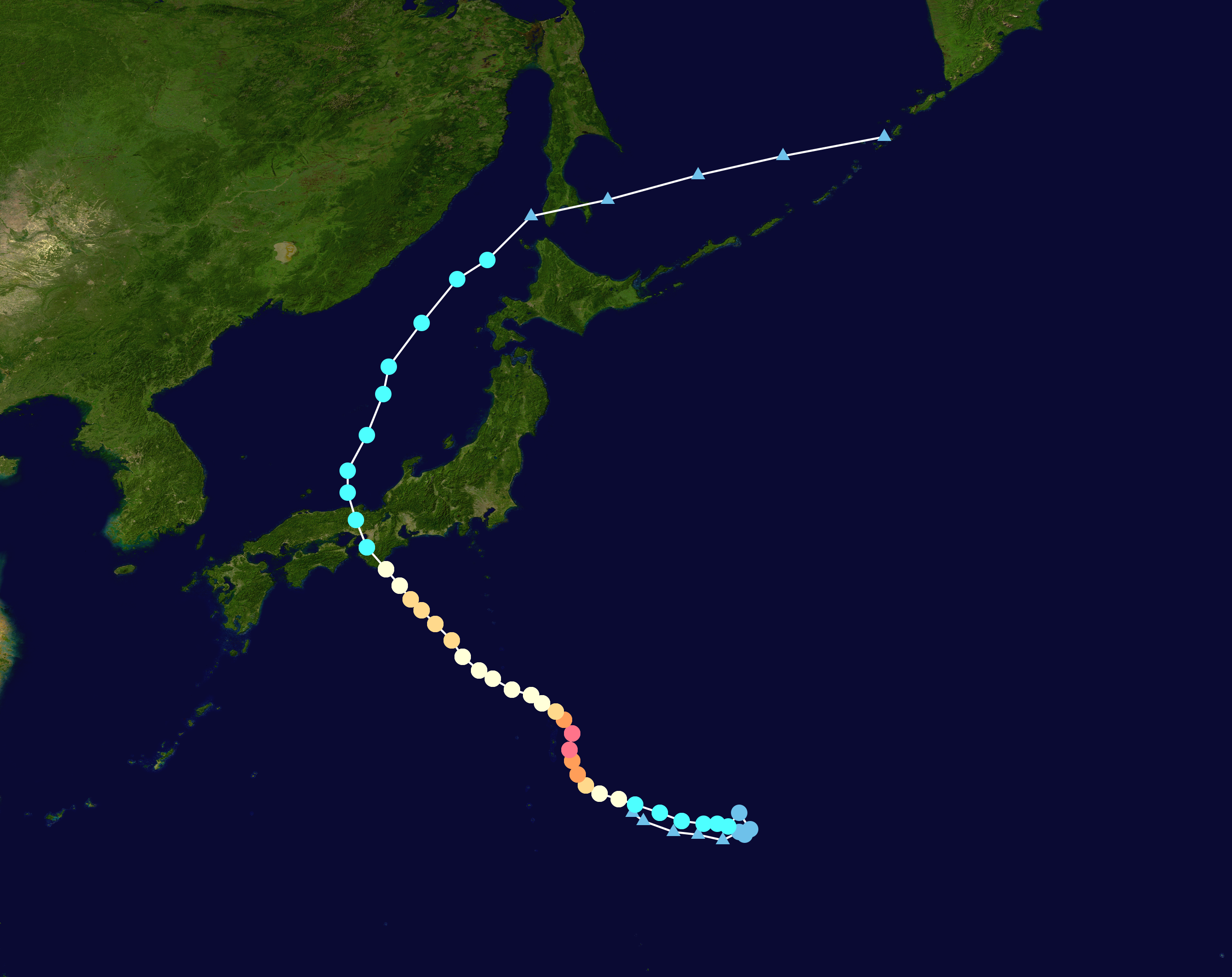
- Duration: August 7 – August 17
- Peak intensity: 165 km/h (105 mph) (10-min); 940 hPa (mbar)

On August 5, the JMA reported that a low-pressure area had formed east-northeast of Iwo Jima. Deep convection shifted toward the southeastern semicircle of the circulation, though the center remained poorly defined. Environmental conditions were marginally conducive for tropical cyclogenesis, with warm SSTs around 29–30 °C (84–86 °F) and low vertical wind shear. Later that day, the JMA upgraded the system to a tropical depression, and the JTWC issued a TCFA. On August 8, JTWC classified it as Tropical Storm 07W, and the JMA named it Lan. Favorable SSTs and low shear allowed Lan to intensify as it tracked westward. The JMA upgraded it to a severe tropical storm on August 9, and it reached typhoon status the next day. On August 11, JTWC upgraded Lan to a Category 4-equivalent typhoon based on Dvorak estimates of 115 kn (213 km/h; 132 mph) winds. However, the storm began to decay as it struggled to maintain convection over a cold ring with cloud tops near −60 °C (−76 °F). Lan made landfall near Cape Shionomisaki, Japan, around 19:00 UTC on August 14. The storm later emerged over the Sea of Japan and weakened further. The JMA issued its final advisory on August 17, declaring Lan extratropical.

The JMA issued purple heavy rain warnings—the second-highest on its four-tier scale—for areas of Kyoto Prefecture and Iwate Prefecture. The typhoon caused landslides, flooding, uprooted trees, and disrupted power. Over 100,000 homes lost electricity, and more than 237,000 people were displaced. One person died, and at least 64 were injured as a result of the typhoon. Economic losses from the storm totaled to $500 million.

=== Typhoon Dora ===
- Typhoon (JMA)
- Category 2 typhoon (SSHWS)
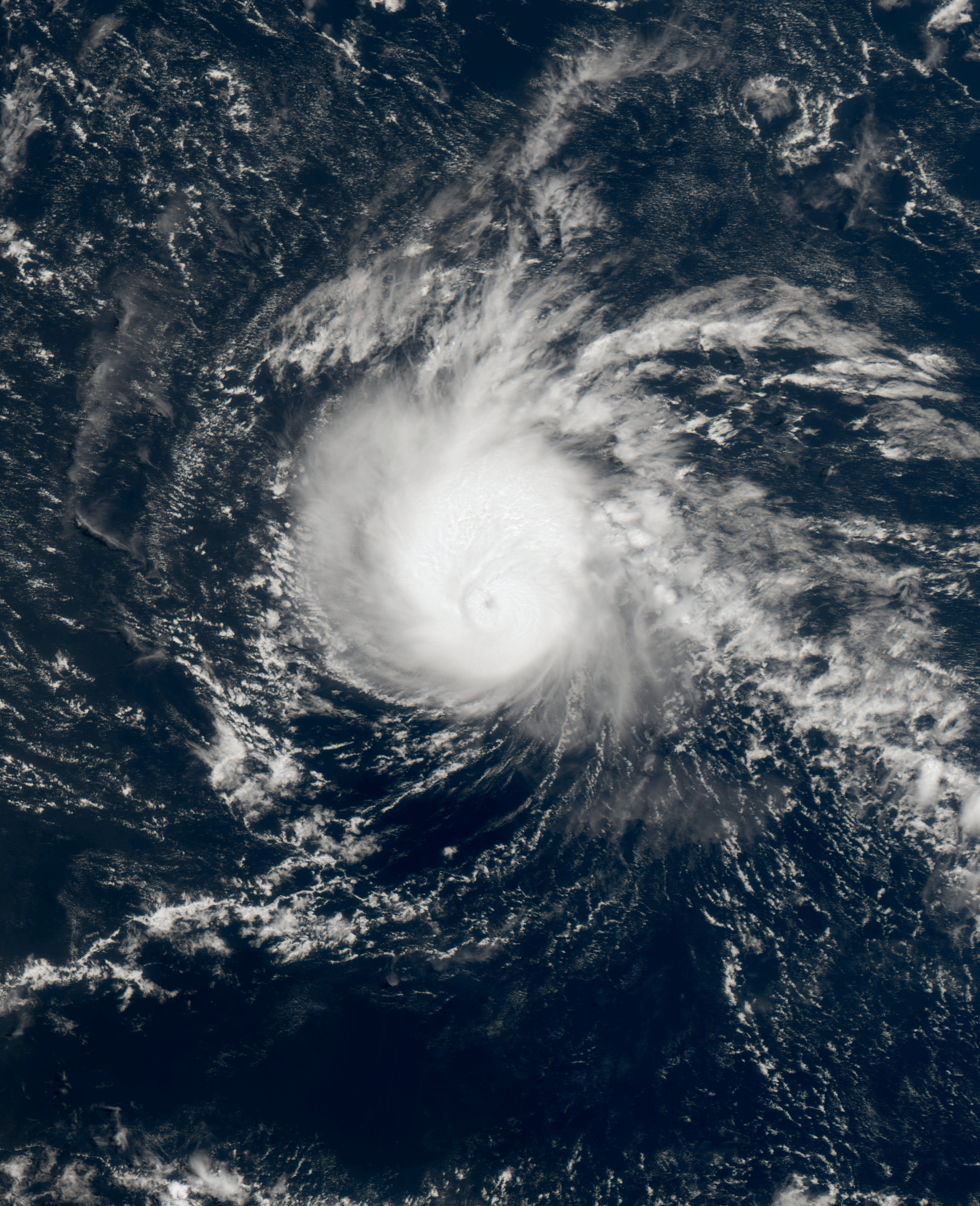
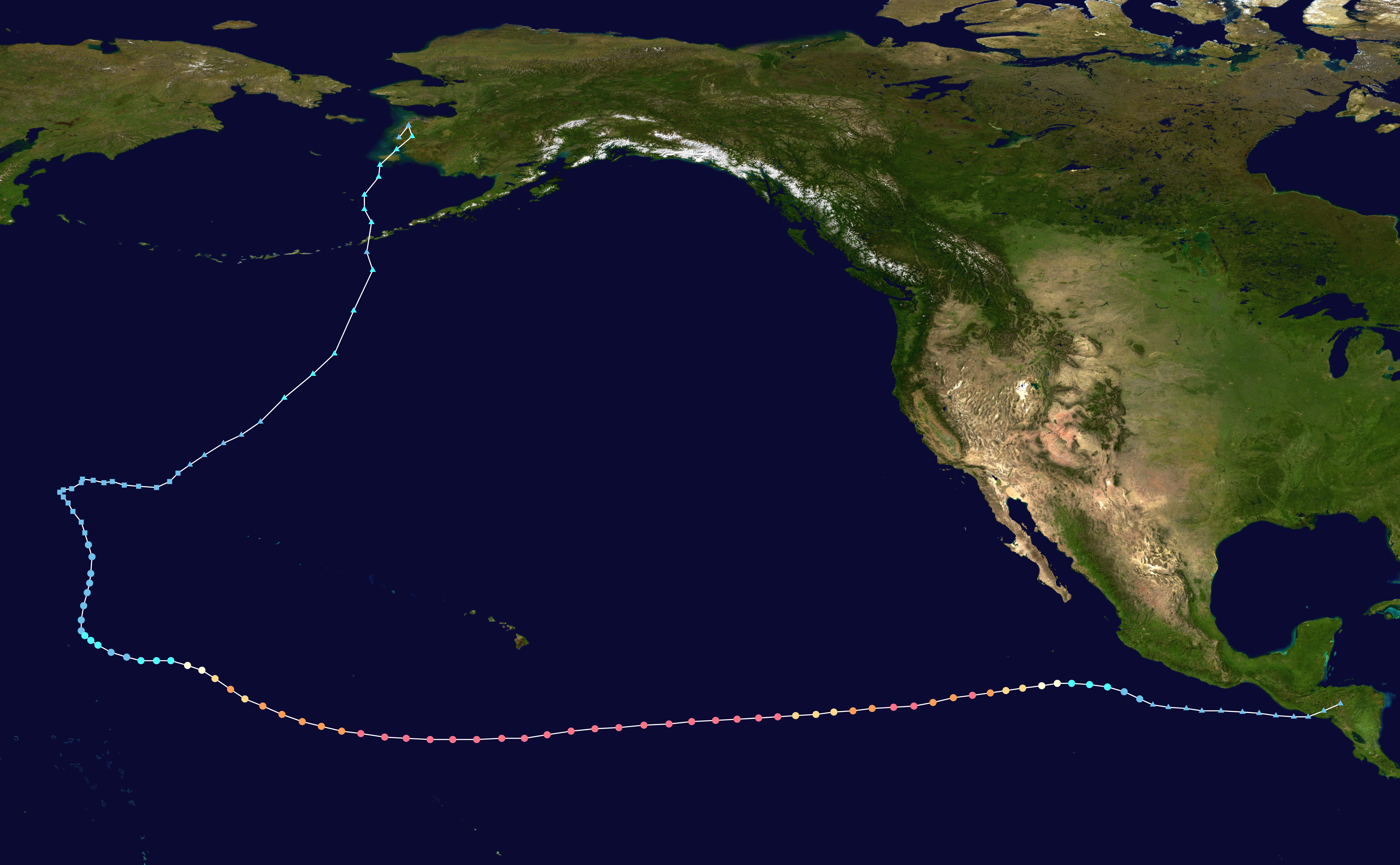
- Duration: August 12 (entered basin) – August 21
- Peak intensity: 140 km/h (85 mph) (10-min); 980 hPa (mbar)

On August 11, a weakening Hurricane Dora moved into the basin from the Central Pacific basin. At 00:00 UTC, August 12, the JMA and the JTWC initiated advisories on Dora, declaring that it had just crossed the International Date Line and classifying it as a typhoon. The cloud tops further warmed and its eye vanished from satellite imagery. Dora showed significant deterioration along the system's northern flank. Dora became increasingly sheared by early August 13, interacting with an upper-level trough. Vertical wind shear exceeded 35 km/h (25 mph). Further decay in the organization of the storm's deep convection caused Dora to be downgraded to a tropical storm. With Dora's ragged center, the system remained disorganized, as wind shear was becoming displaced to the east. By the early hours of August 15, both agencies issued their final warnings on Dora; its LLCC further became broad and exposed. At 06:00 UTC on August 21 it fully transitioned to an extratropical system, according to the JMA. Both agencies continued tracking Dora until it exited the basin on the next day.

=== Typhoon Saola (Goring) ===
- Violent typhoon (JMA)
- Category 5 super typhoon (SSHWS)
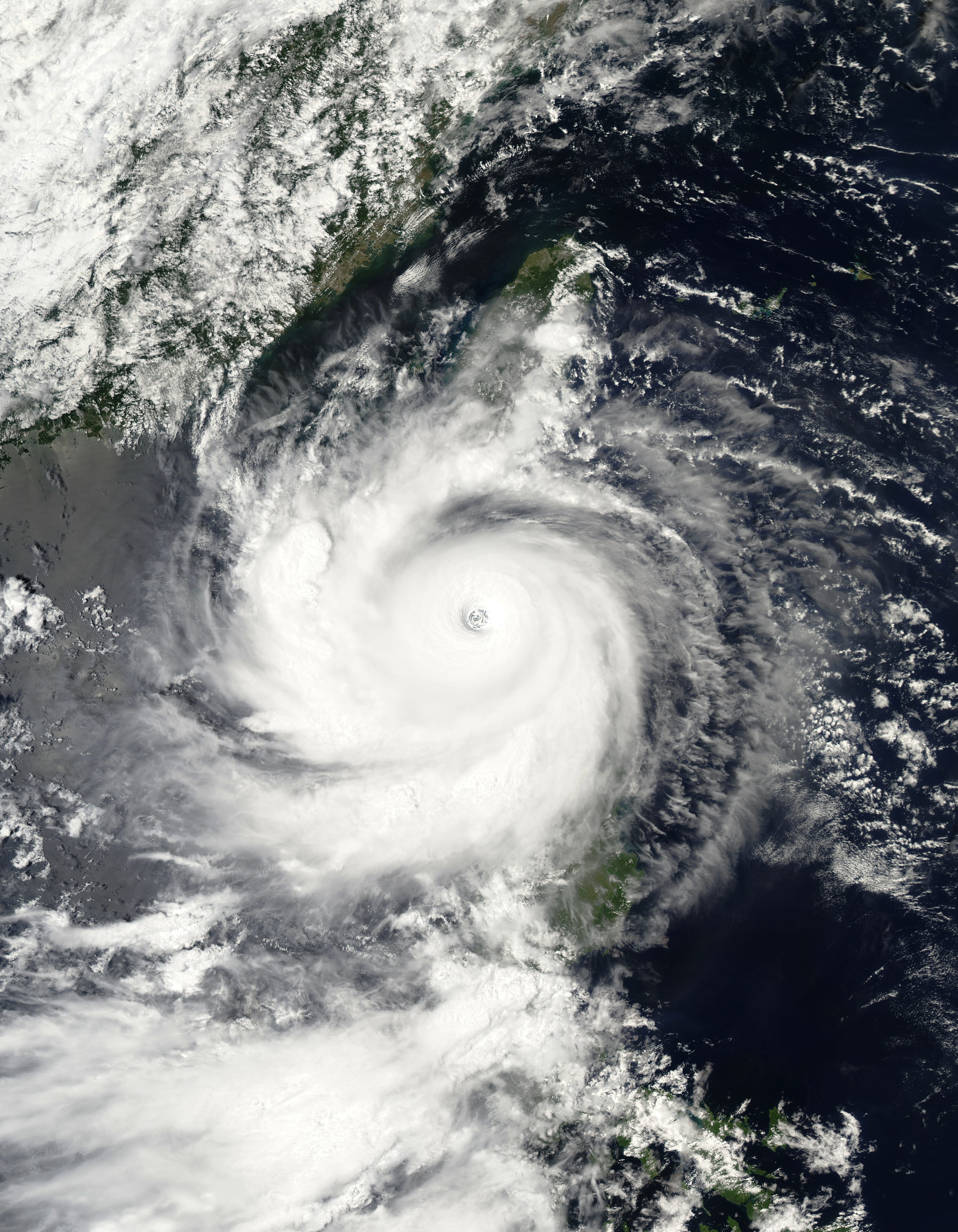
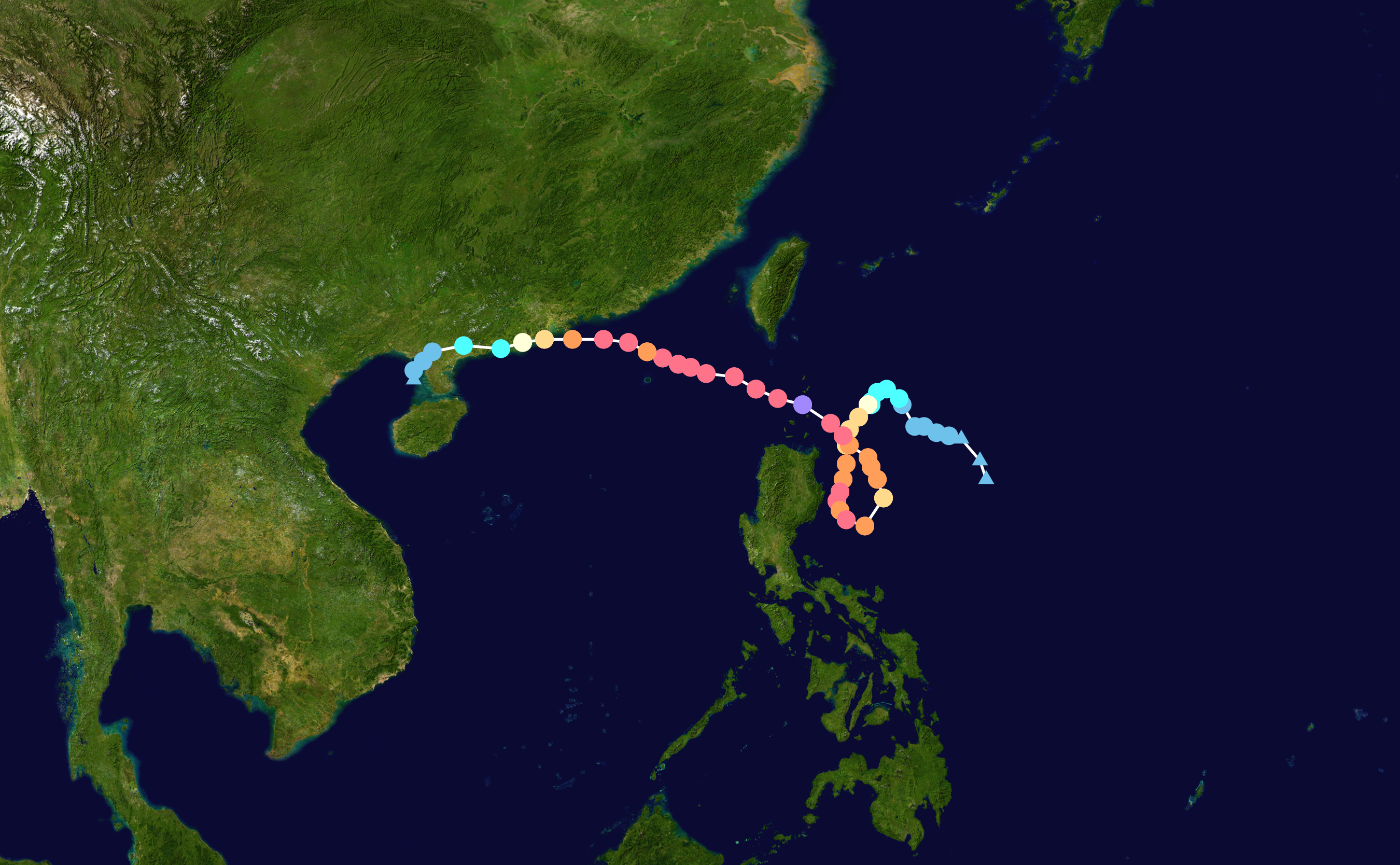
- Duration: August 22 – September 3
- Peak intensity: 195 km/h (120 mph) (10-min); 920 hPa (mbar)

On August 20, an area of convection east of Taiwan began moving southwestward with little central organization. The PAGASA initially assessed it as unlikely to develop into a tropical cyclone, but later upgraded it to a tropical depression on August 23, assigning it the local name Goring. The JTWC issued a Tropical Cyclone Formation Alert, designating it as Tropical Depression 09W. Goring moved north-northwestward across the Philippine Sea, and on August 24, it was upgraded to a tropical storm by the JTWC. The JMA followed at 06:00 UTC, naming it Saola. It then turned southwestward east of the Batanes and began rapid intensification, reaching Category 4-equivalent strength on August 27.

After a south-southeastward turn, Saola weakened to a Category 2-equivalent typhoon but re-intensified to a Category 5-equivalent super typhoon on August 29 as it neared the edge of the Philippine Area of Responsibility. Saola remained intense as it approached Hong Kong and China. The Hong Kong Observatory issued Hurricane Signal No. 10 at 20:15 HKT on September 1, the first such issuance since Typhoon Mangkhut in 2018. It passed south of Macau and Hong Kong, bringing strong winds and heavy rain, and made landfall in Guangdong, China as a Category 3-equivalent typhoon. Saola weakened to a severe tropical storm as it moved inland and dissipated on September 3.

In real-time, JTWC believed that Saola only peaked as a Category 4-super typhoon. However, in a 2024 post-analysis by the agency confirmed that Saola had reached Category 5-equivalent strength near the Babuyan Islands.

=== Severe Tropical Storm Damrey ===
- Severe tropical storm (JMA)
- Tropical storm (SSHWS)
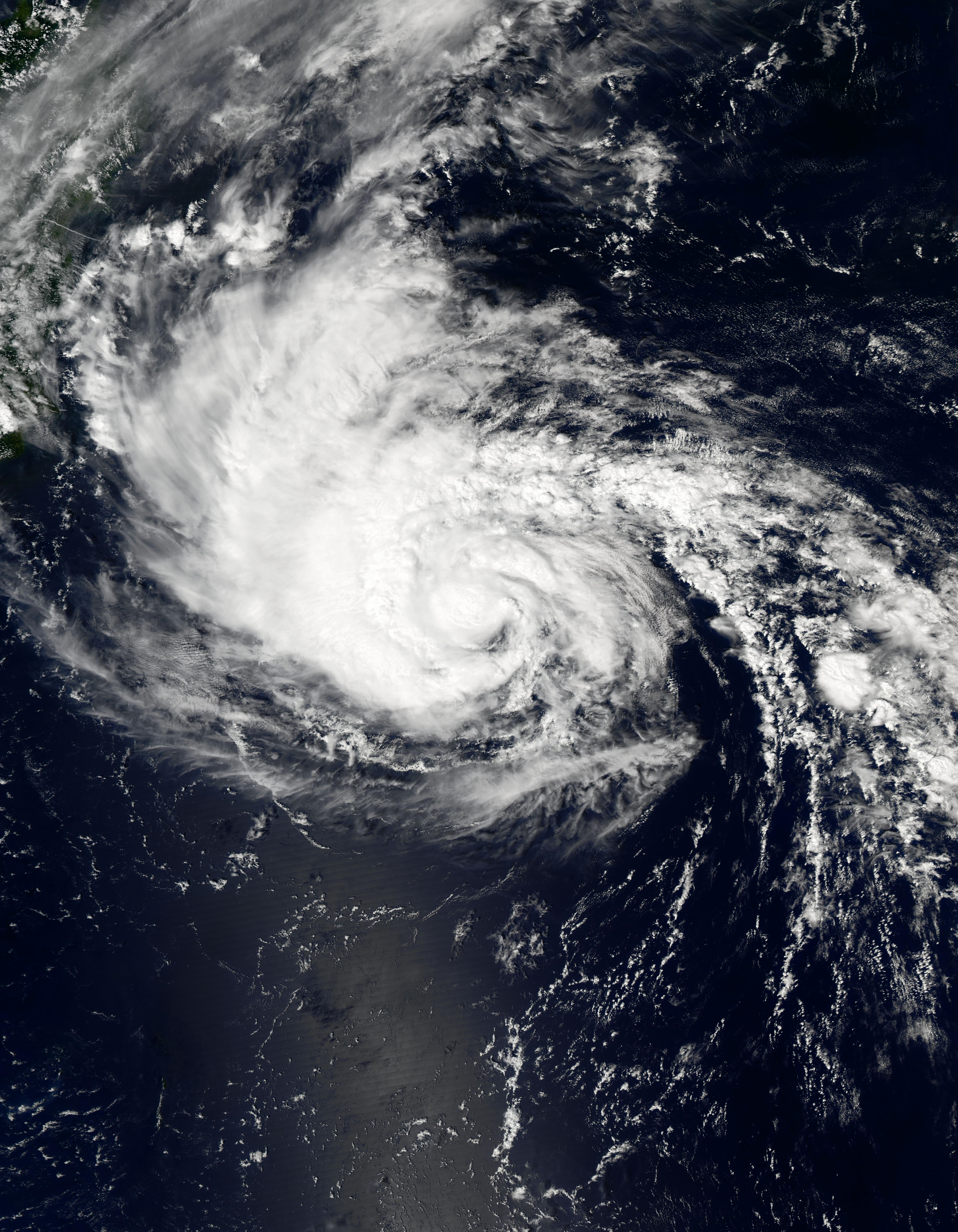
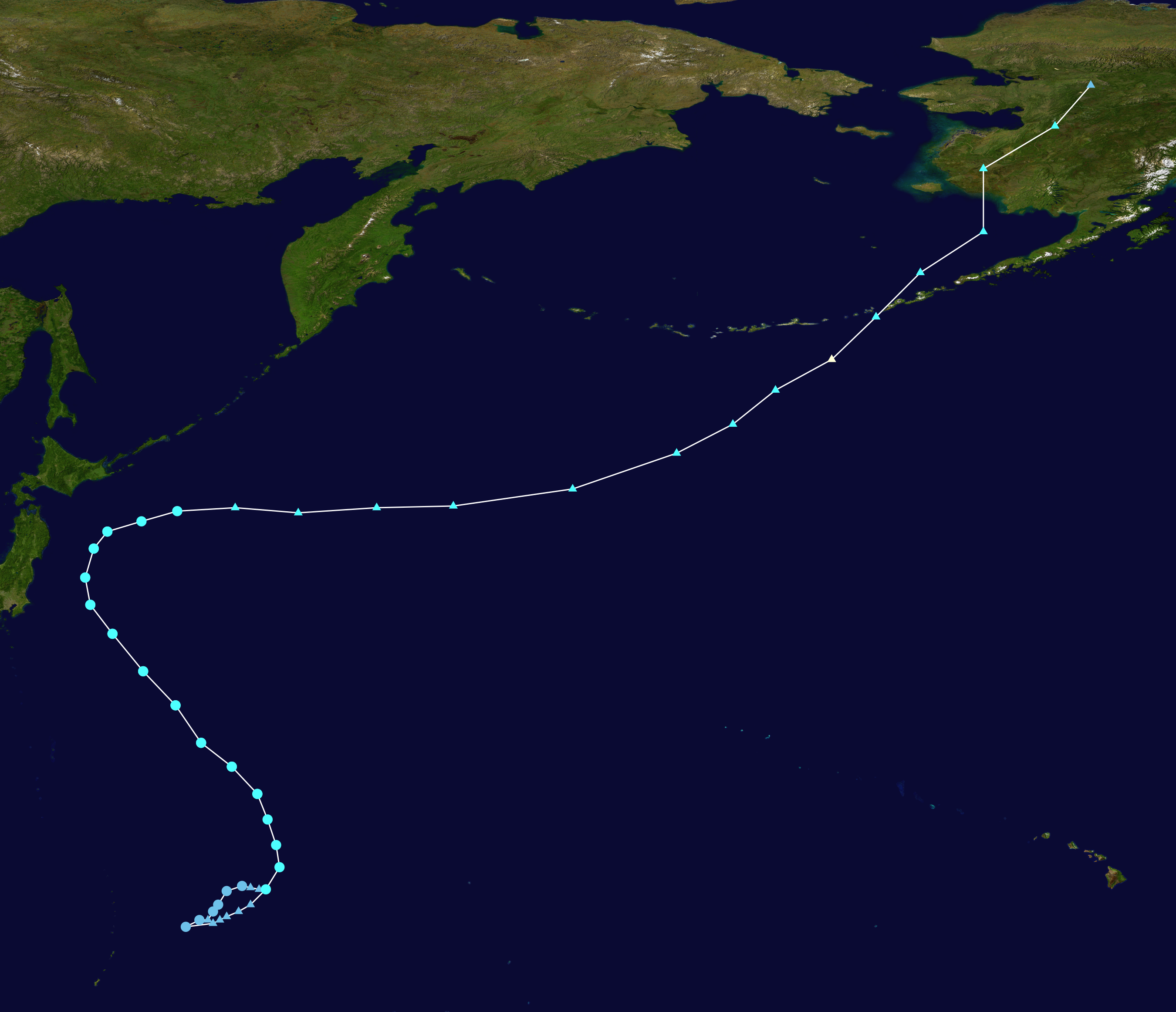
- Duration: August 23 – August 29
- Peak intensity: 95 km/h (60 mph) (10-min); 985 hPa (mbar)

On August 21, the JMA started tracking a tropical depression in the open Western Pacific. The JTWC then followed suit on August 23 by upgrading the system into a tropical depression, and designating it as 08W. The JMA later upgraded the system into a tropical storm on August 24, receiving the name Damrey, with the JTWC following suit later on August 25. It gradually intensified as it moves northward, becoming a severe tropical storm and Category 1-equivalent typhoon, by the JMA and the JTWC, respectively, well east of Japan, on August 27. It turned post-tropical on August 29. However, a post-analysis from JTWC in 2024 showed that Damrey was downgraded and only peaked as a tropical storm throughout its path.

The remnants of the storm delivered high winds in Alaska, with a 69 mph (111 km/h) wind gust in Potter Marsh and 43 mph (69 km/h) gust at Ted Stevens Anchorage International Airport. High winds hit the Anchorage Bowl on Thursday, knocking out power to thousands as the remnants blow in the Southeastern Alaska. Strong winds downed trees throughout town that hit power lines and caused outages.

=== Typhoon Haikui (Hanna) ===
- Very strong typhoon (JMA)
- Category 3 typhoon (SSHWS)
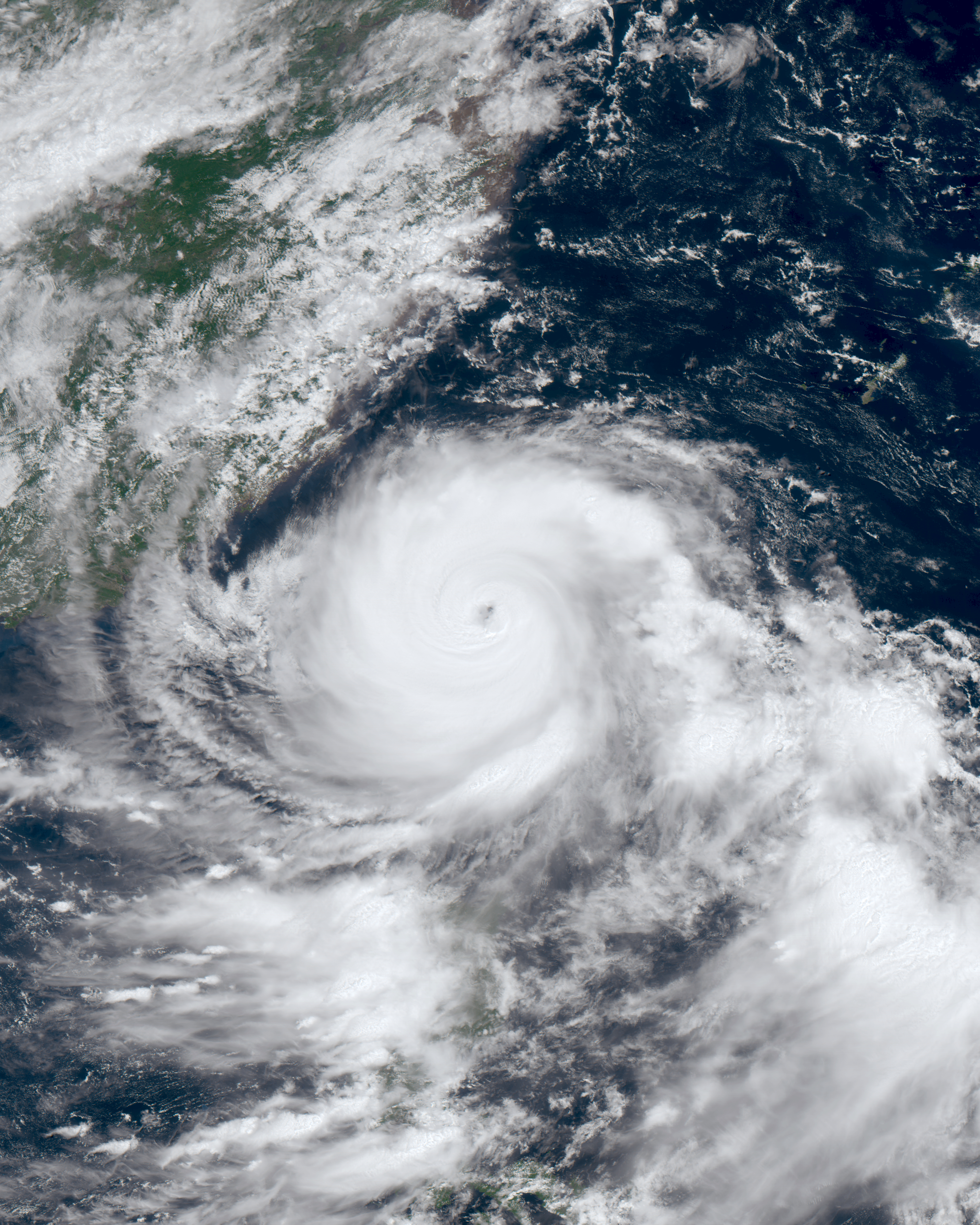
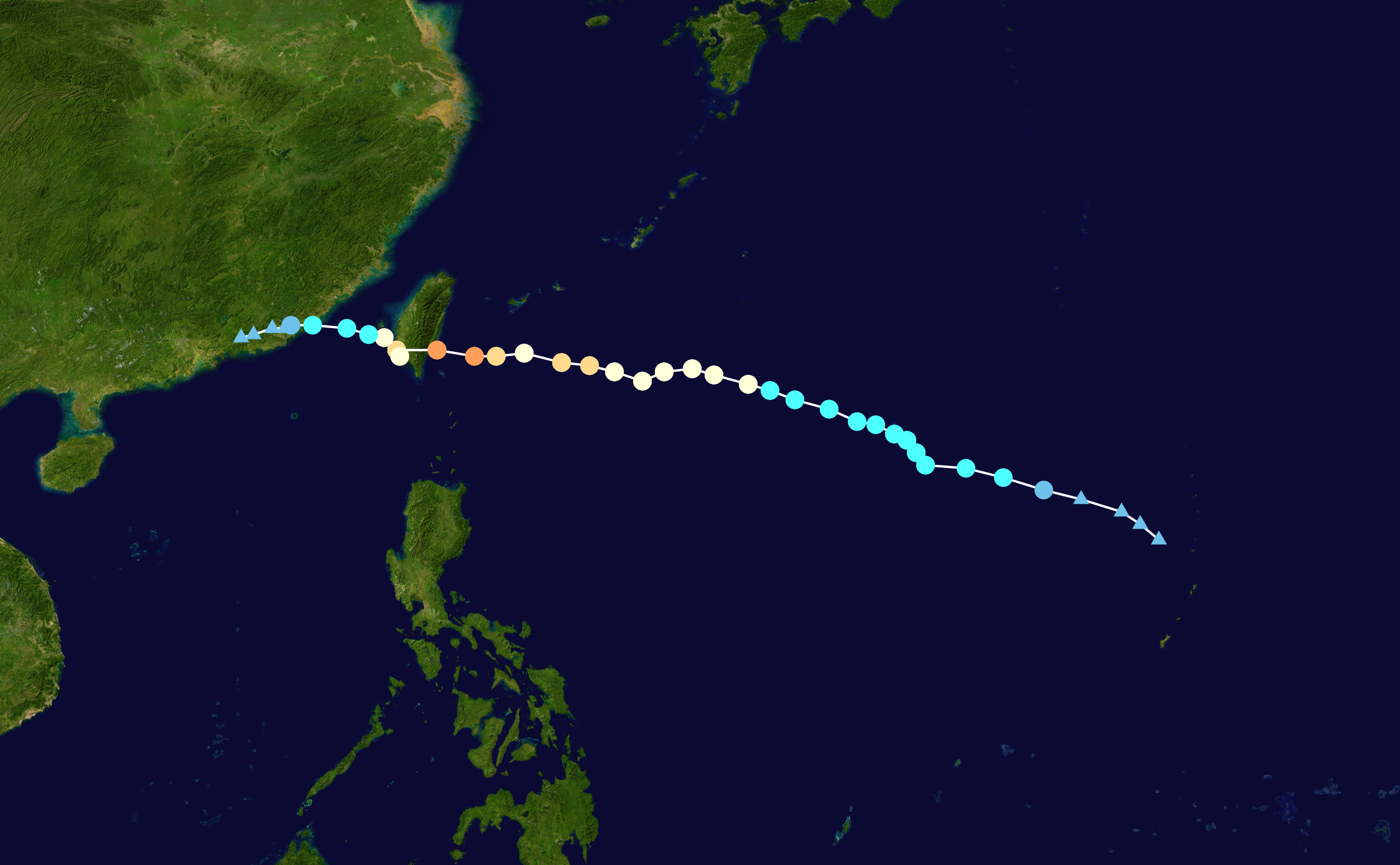
- Duration: August 27 – September 6
- Peak intensity: 155 km/h (100 mph) (10-min); 945 hPa (mbar)

Whilst Typhoon Saola was exhibiting a counter-clockwise loop east of the Philippines, a new broad low-pressure area developed into a tropical depression on August 27, near the Northern Mariana Islands, while slowly drifting westward. On August 28, the JMA subsequently upgraded into a tropical storm, naming it as Haikui. The JTWC began initiating advisories thereafter and was designated Tropical Depression 10W. Haikui then later strengthened into a severe tropical storm before entering PAR, where it was locally named Hanna. Haikui continues to move westwards across the Philippine Sea, before finally reaching typhoon status on September 1. Haikui began undergoing rapid intensification by September 3 at least 18 hours before landfall, becoming a strong Category 3 typhoon. It then struck over Taitung County, Taiwan. Due to its land interaction, it weaken back into a minimal Category 1 typhoon before moving erratically over the next few hours, heading eastwards and making a second landfall in Kaohsiung, Taiwan. The JMA then downgraded Haikui back into a severe tropical storm as its circulation became degraded after the landfall. On September 5, Haikui made its final landfall along the coast of Dongshan County, Fujian before it dissipated on September 6.

On September 7, the remnants of Typhoon Haikui brought record breaking rainfall to Hong Kong. Hong Kong Observatory recorded 158 millimeters of rain between 11pm and midnight local time, the highest hourly rainfall rate since records began in 1884. Some parts of the city even accumulated over 900 mm of rainfall within just 24 hours. Four people were killed in Hong Kong as a result of the flash floods. Other parts of the Pearl River Delta, including Shenzhen and Macau, were also severely impacted.

=== Tropical Storm Kirogi ===
- Tropical storm (JMA)
- Category 1 typhoon (SSHWS)
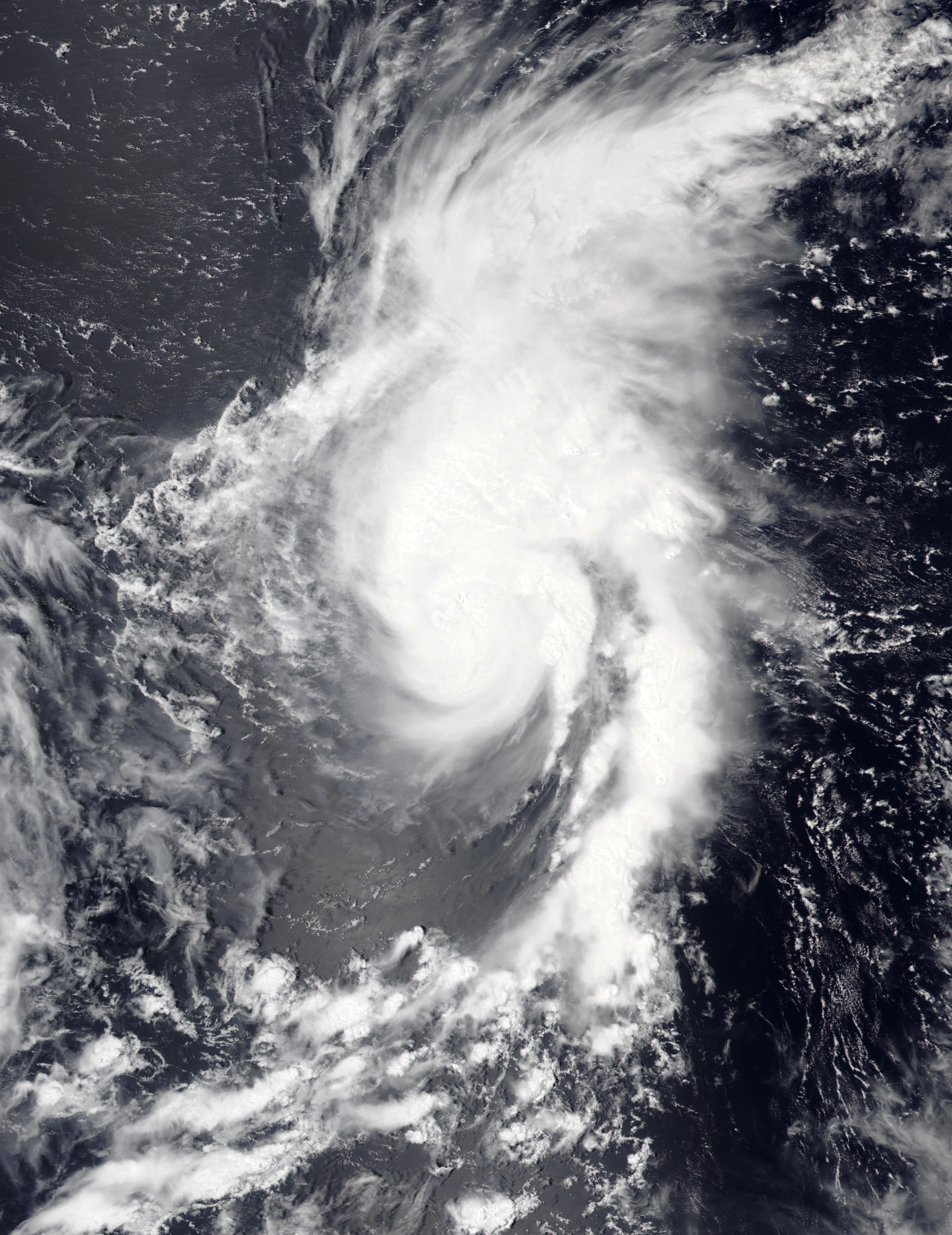
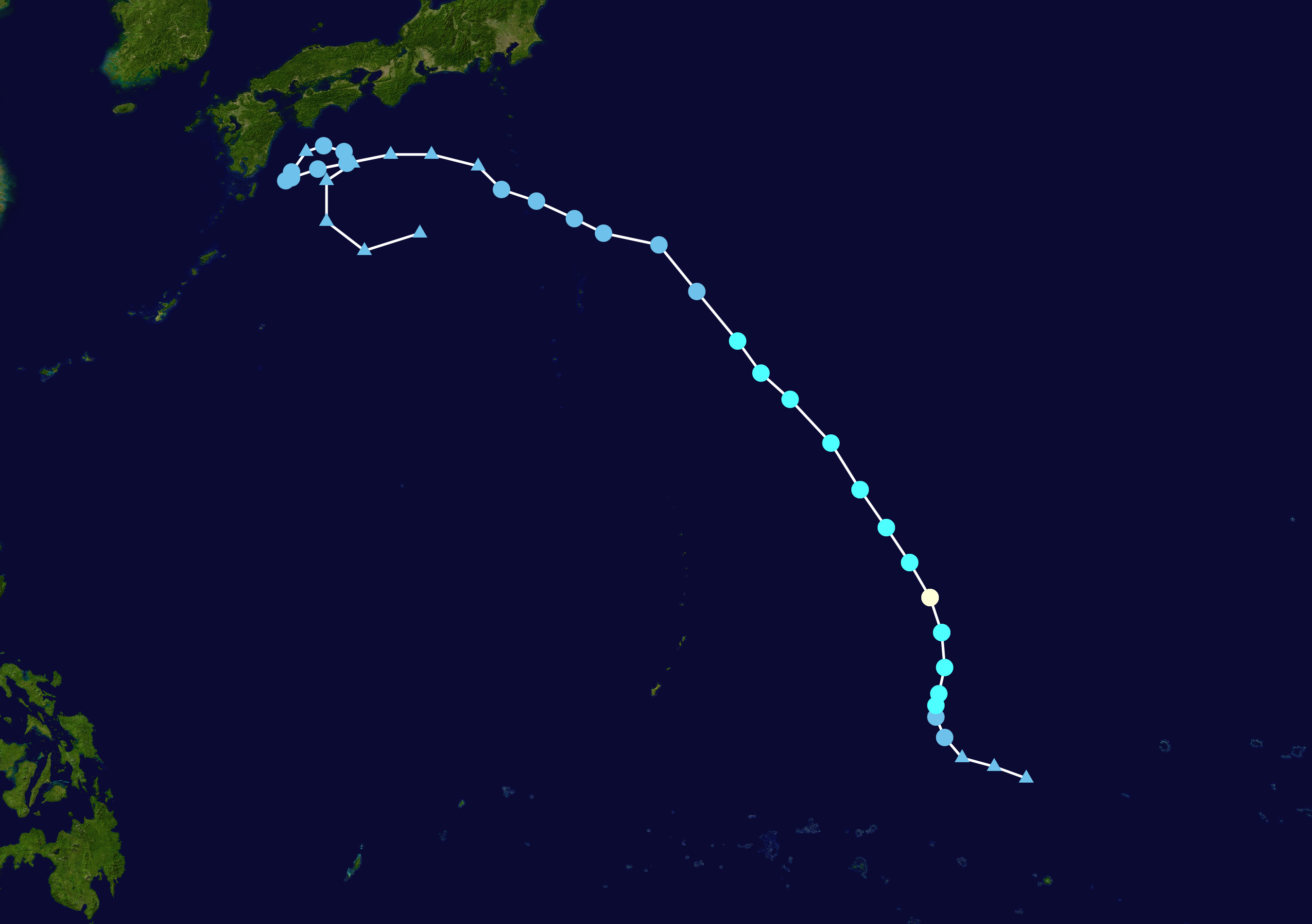
- Duration: August 29 – September 6
- Peak intensity: 85 km/h (50 mph) (10-min); 994 hPa (mbar)

On August 29, a low-pressure area located far east of Guam began to develop, being aided by a favorable environment with low wind shear. Over the next day, the JTWC started issuing advisories as it steadily intensified, upgrading the system to a tropical depression, designated as 11W.

Slowly intensifying while moving generally northwest, the system developed into a tropical storm, as announced by JTWC, on August 30. JMA followed suit shortly thereafter, giving it the name Kirogi. On September 2, Kirogi would weaken into a tropical depression. Its remnants would meander near Japan, interacting with Tropical Storm Yun-yeung for a few days before dissipating on September 6.

In real-time, the JMA assessed Kirogi peaking as a severe tropical storm, however in their post-analysis in November 28, the JMA would state that Kirogi actually peaked as a tropical storm.

=== Tropical Storm Yun-yeung (Ineng) ===
- Tropical storm (JMA)
- Tropical storm (SSHWS)
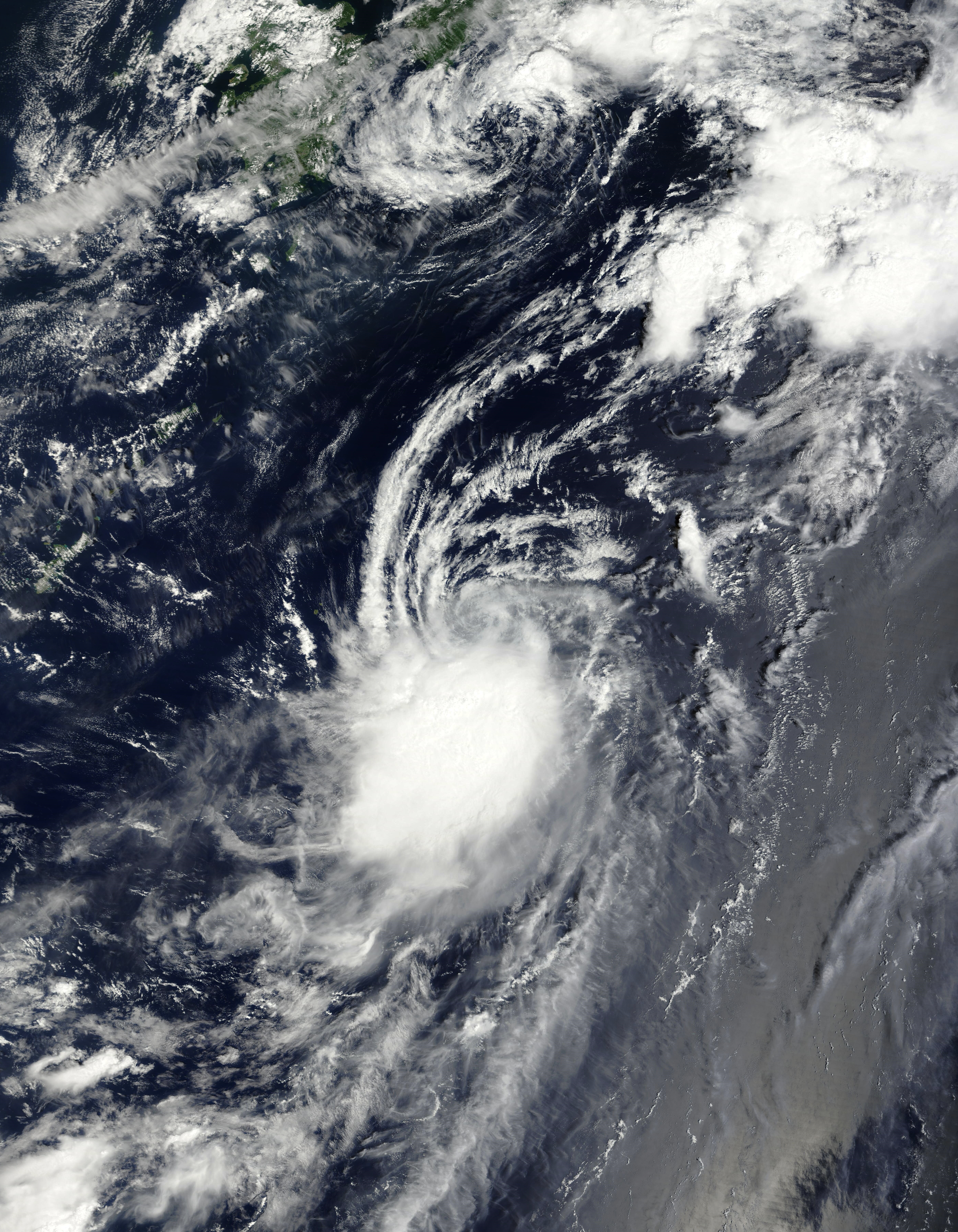
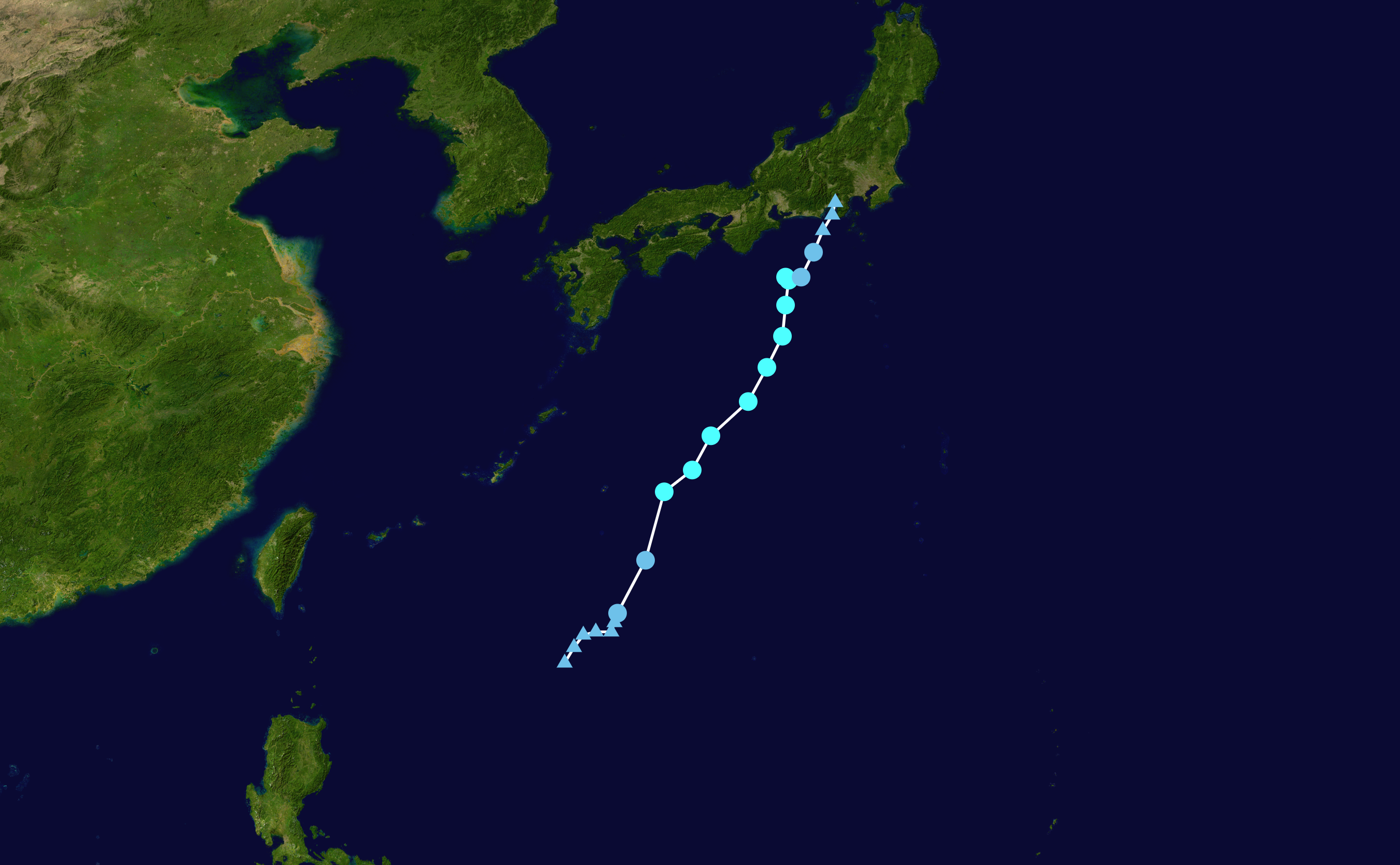
- Duration: September 4 – September 9
- Peak intensity: 75 km/h (45 mph) (10-min); 998 hPa (mbar)

From the bands of Typhoon Haikui, an area of low pressure formed in the Philippine Sea in early September. The low-pressure area intensified into a tropical depression on September 4 and was later named Ineng by the PAGASA. A day later, the Japan Meteorological Agency (JMA) upgraded Ineng into a tropical storm and was given the name Yun-yeung, which replaced Kai-tak. Shortly after being named, on September 6, Yun-yeung left the PAR at around 06:00 PHT (22:00 UTC). Yun-yeung continued to move northward slowly as it approaches central and eastern Japan. The JMA last noted Yun-yeung on 18:00 UTC of September 8 in Suruga Bay near Shizuoka, Japan.

Yun-yeung brought heavy rain across wide areas of Japan, prompting warnings over the risk of flooding and mudslides. Some train lines were impacted in the Kanto region on Friday. JR East suspended some lines and limited express trains on Friday, and multiple lines experienced delays. Total losses are estimated at US$300 million.

=== Tropical Depression 13W ===
- Tropical depression (JMA)
- Tropical depression (SSHWS)
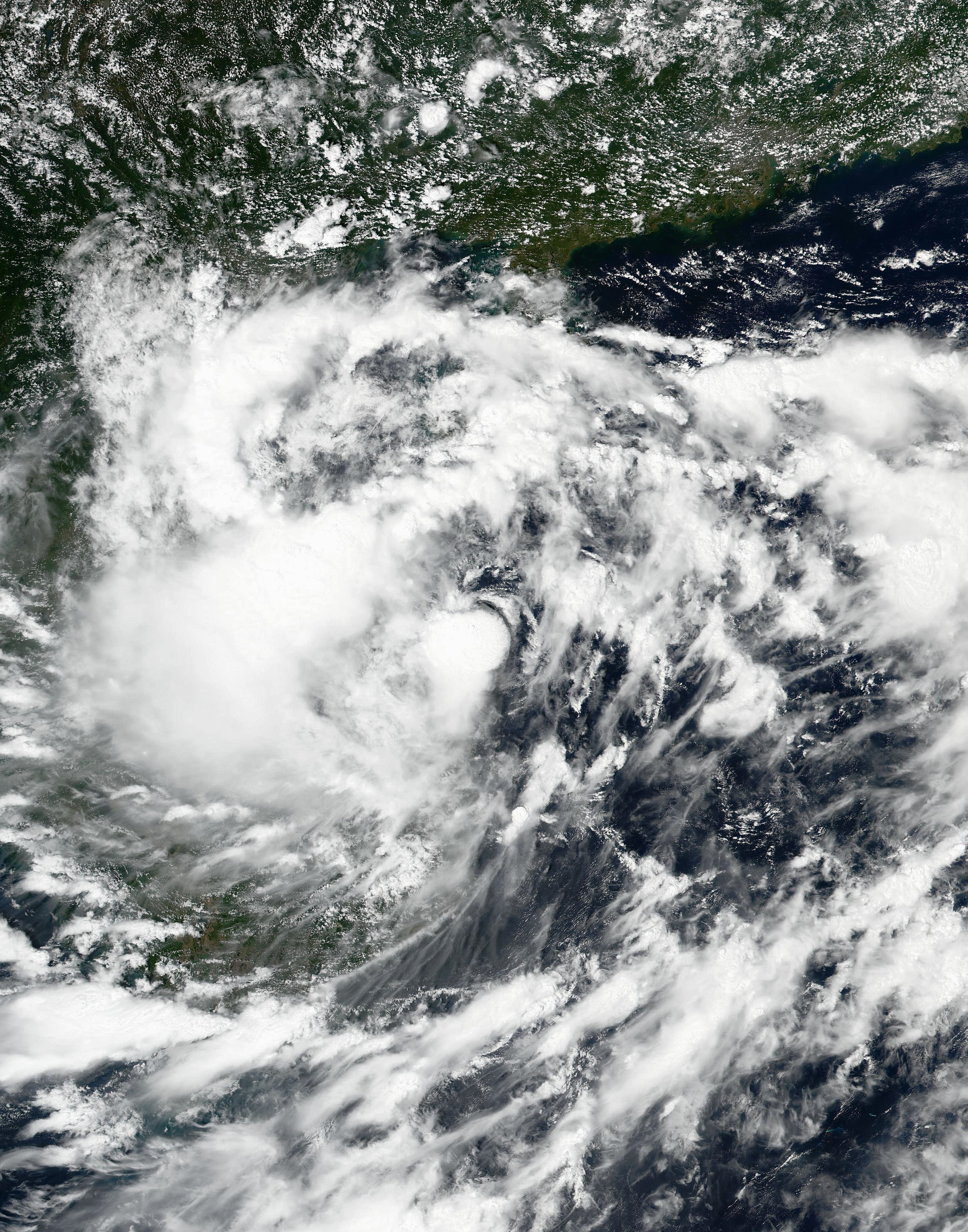
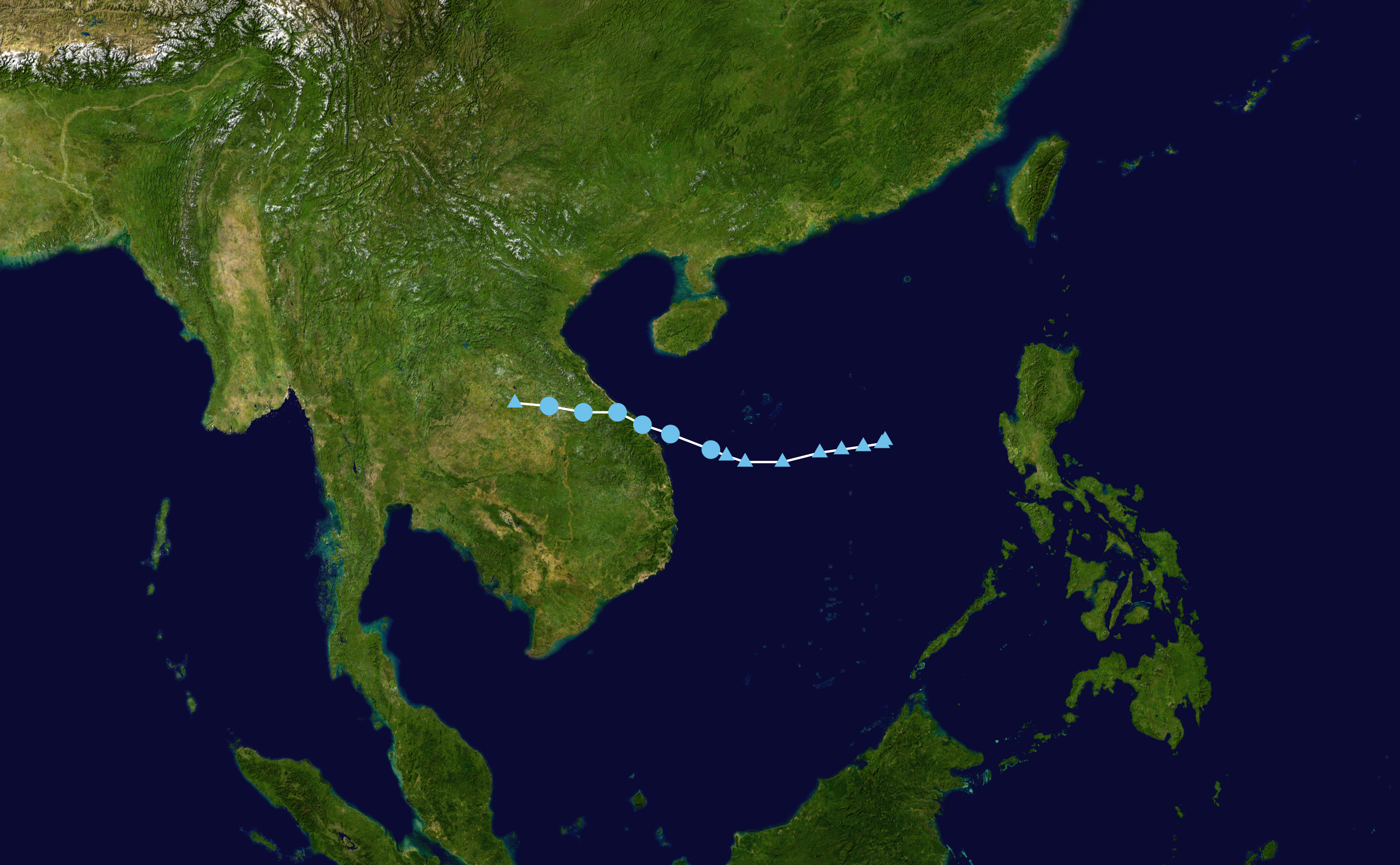
- Duration: September 24 – September 27
- Peak intensity: <55 km/h (35 mph) (10-min); 1000 hPa (mbar)

An area of low-pressure formed near the Southern Philippines. On September 24, JMA recognized it as a tropical depression as it tracked westward. Around the same day, JTWC designated the system as 13W. It was tracking north-northwestward toward the Vietnam coast. The JMA last tracked the system on September 27.

Flooding occurred in Da Nang, Quảng Trị, Quảng Bình, Bình Định, Thanh Hóa, Nghệ An and Hà Tĩnh. Damage in Vietnam reached 1.049 trillion (US$43 million).

=== Typhoon Koinu (Jenny) ===
- Very strong typhoon (JMA)
- Category 4 typhoon (SSHWS)
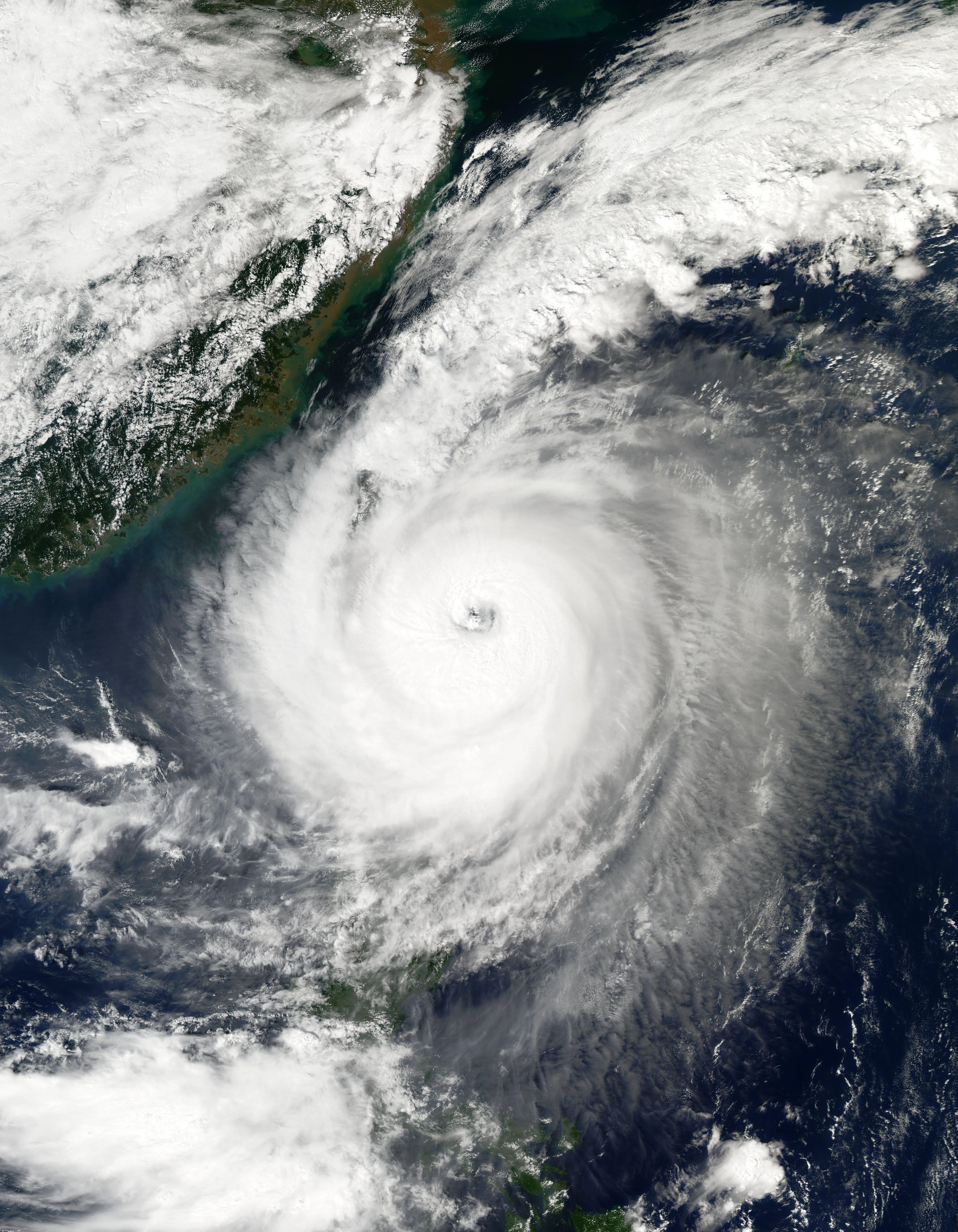
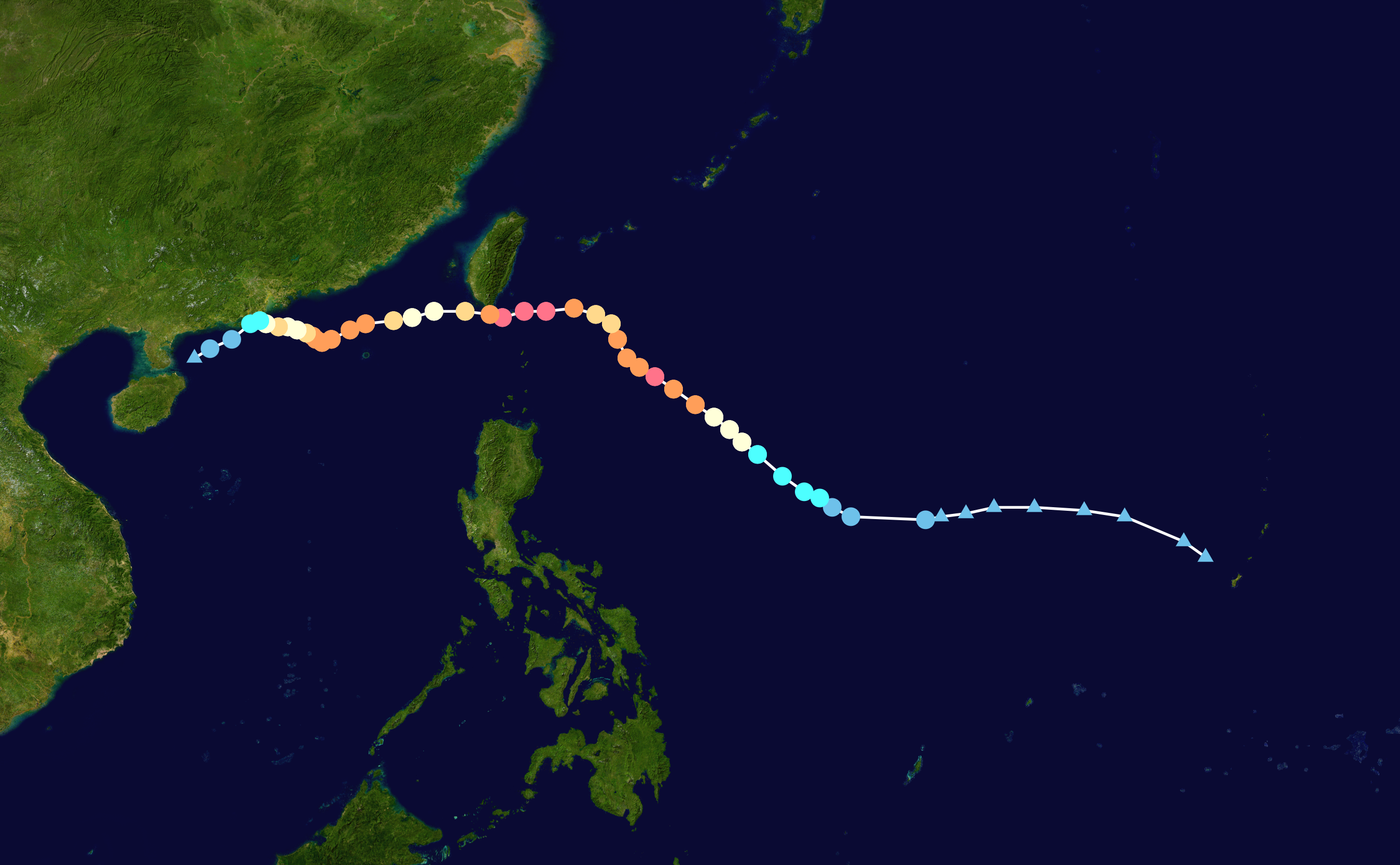
- Duration: September 28 – October 9
- Peak intensity: 165 km/h (105 mph) (10-min); 940 hPa (mbar)

On September 27, a low-pressure system formed near Guam, with the JTWC indicating the potential development of a tropical cyclone in the coming days. It moved westward into the Philippine Sea until it entered the Philippine Area of Responsibility, where it was later upgraded into a tropical depression and gained the name Jenny by the PAGASA. A Tropical Cyclone Formation Alert was then issued for Jenny as it began to show signs of further organization. JTWC later recognized it as Tropical Depression 14W. On September 28, JMA upgraded the system into a tropical storm, giving it the name Koinu which replaced the name Tembin. Koinu moved west-northwestward in the Philippine Sea whilst having its low-level circulation exposed due to wind shear. The system intensified into a Category 1 typhoon by the JTWC. However, rapid intensification ensued, prompted the JTWC to upgrade the system into a Category 3 typhoon.

Koinu weakened to Category 2 strength yet reintensified and reached Category 4 whilst nearing Taiwan and moving west-northwestward. Koinu passed dangerously close to Lanyu before making its first landfall on mainland Hengchun, Taiwan, later weakening into a Category 3 storm as it did soon. Koinu then weakened into a Category 1 and later exited the PAR into the South China Sea. Contrary to forecasts, Koinu unexpectedly restrengthened back into a Category 2, reforming a clear visible eye surrounded by a powerful eyewall. Koinu further intensified, regaining Category 3 status east of Guangdong. After re-intensifying, Koinu weakened again for the last time. Dry air intrusion and land interaction caused the system to be downgraded to a tropical storm before reaching Leizhou Peninsula into the Gulf of Tonkin. Both agencies ceased their advisories as Koinu weakened into a remnant low on October 10.

=== Typhoon Bolaven ===
- Violent typhoon (JMA)
- Category 5 super typhoon (SSHWS)
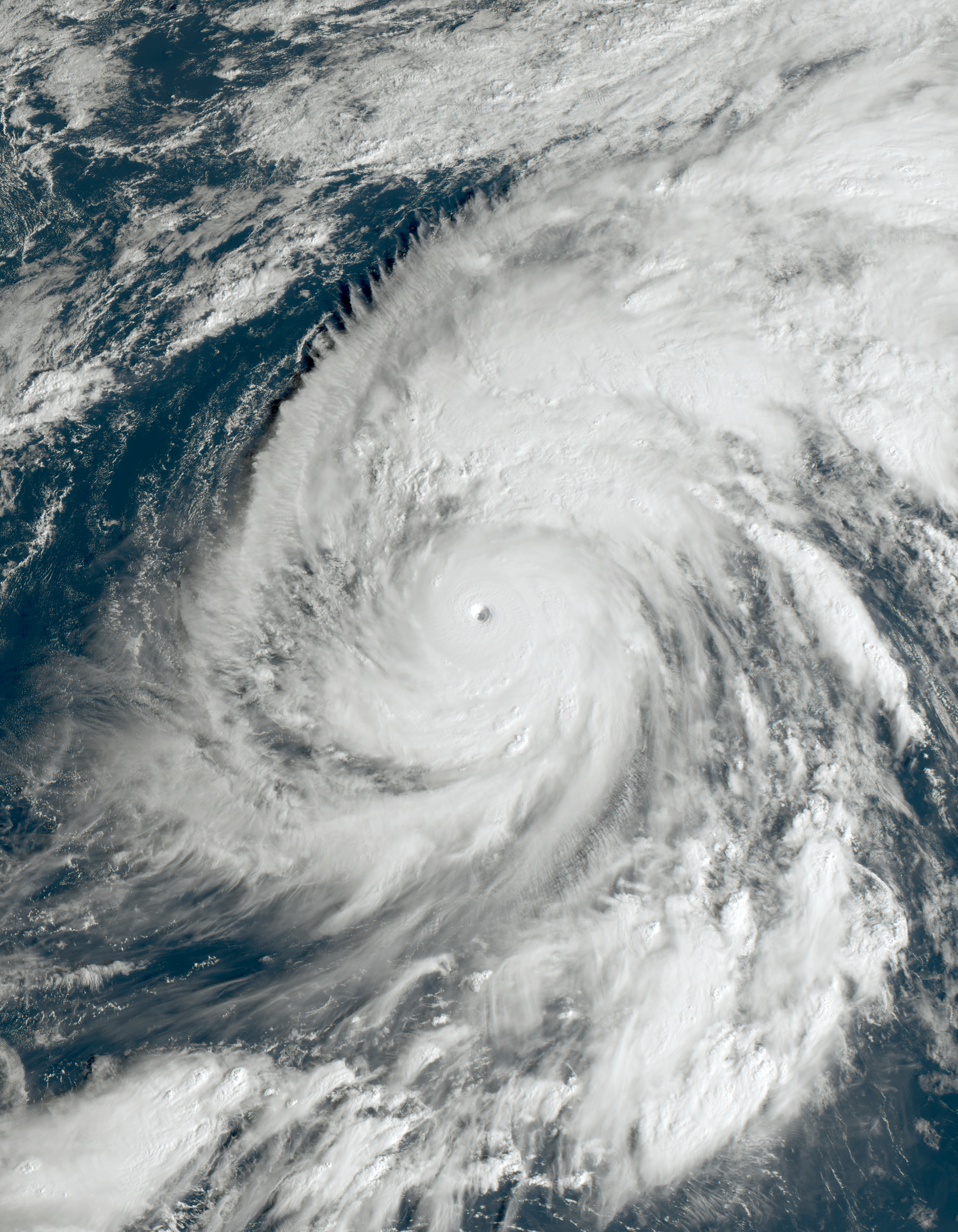
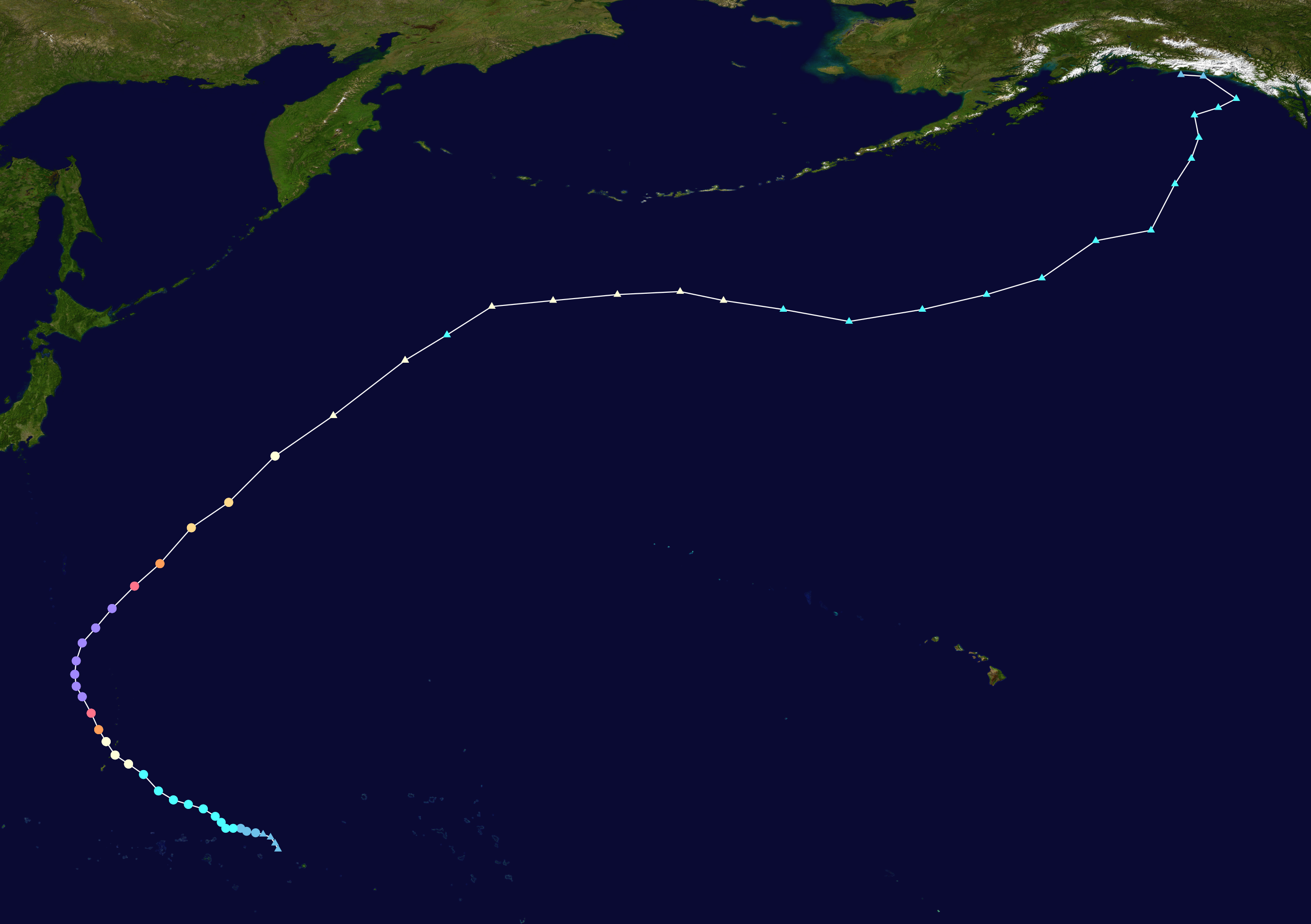
- Duration: October 6 – October 14
- Peak intensity: 215 km/h (130 mph) (10-min); 905 hPa (mbar)

A tropical depression was first noted by the JMA on October 6. The next day, the JTWC designated it as 15W after persistent convection developed around its LLCC. Despite its disorganized state, the system gradually consolidated and was upgraded to Tropical Storm Bolaven later that day. Bolaven developed poleward outflow into the southern edge of a tropical upper tropospheric trough cell, with persistent vortical hot towers over its western quadrant. The JMA upgraded it to a severe tropical storm on October 8, and to a typhoon on October 10, along with the JTWC. Shortly after passing the Mariana Islands, Bolaven underwent explosive intensification, strengthening from a 150 km/h (90 mph) Category 1-equivalent to a 260 km/h (160 mph) Category 5-equivalent super typhoon within 12‑hours, peaking at 00:00 UTC on October 11. At peak strength, it exhibited the stadium effect, and the JTWC estimated 1-minute sustained winds at 305 km/h (190 mph). Bolaven began to weaken on October 12 due to increasing wind shear, and weakened below super typhoon strength the following day as it recurved northeastward. The storm began extratropical transition on October 14, prompting the JTWC to cease advisories.

As Typhoon Bolaven approached, the Mariana Islands were still recovering from Typhoon Mawar five months earlier. Guam Governor Lou Leon Guerrero declared a state of emergency on October 8, approved by U.S. President Joe Biden on the following day. Bolaven passed over the Northern Mariana Islands on October 10. Saipan International Airport recorded sustained winds of 89 km/h (55 mph) and gusts up to 126 km/h (78 mph), while gusts at Antonio B. Won Pat International Airport in Guam reached 80 km/h (50 mph). Businesses in Guam closed, and the Guam Power Authority reported outages. Minor flooding and damage were reported in Inalåhan. High winds caused outages in Tinian and Rota, and partial blackouts in Saipan. Turbidity in Rota's water supply prompted a boil-water advisory. Despite the emergency declaration, no federal aid was provided to Guam.

=== Tropical Storm Sanba ===
- Tropical storm (JMA)
- Tropical storm (SSHWS)
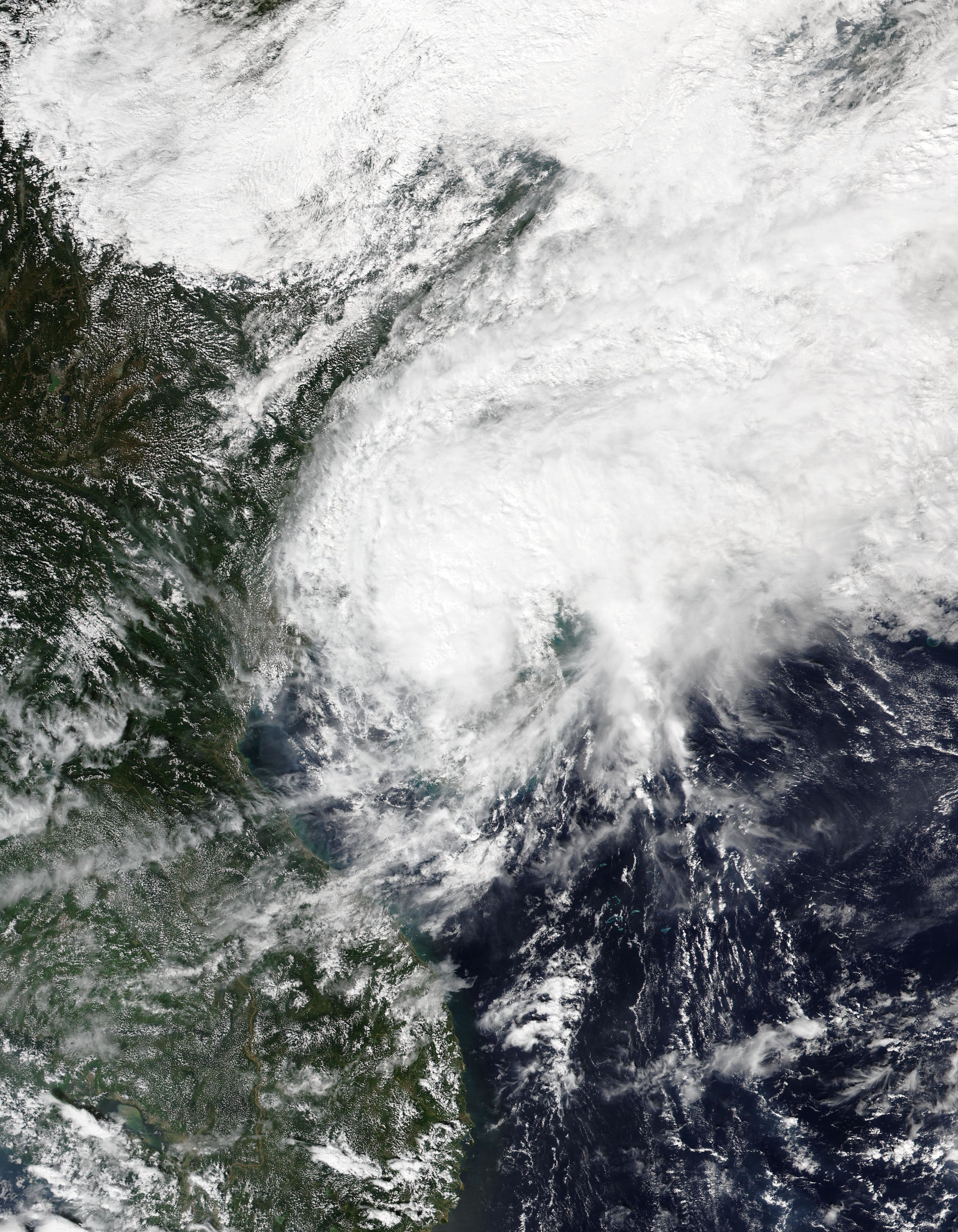
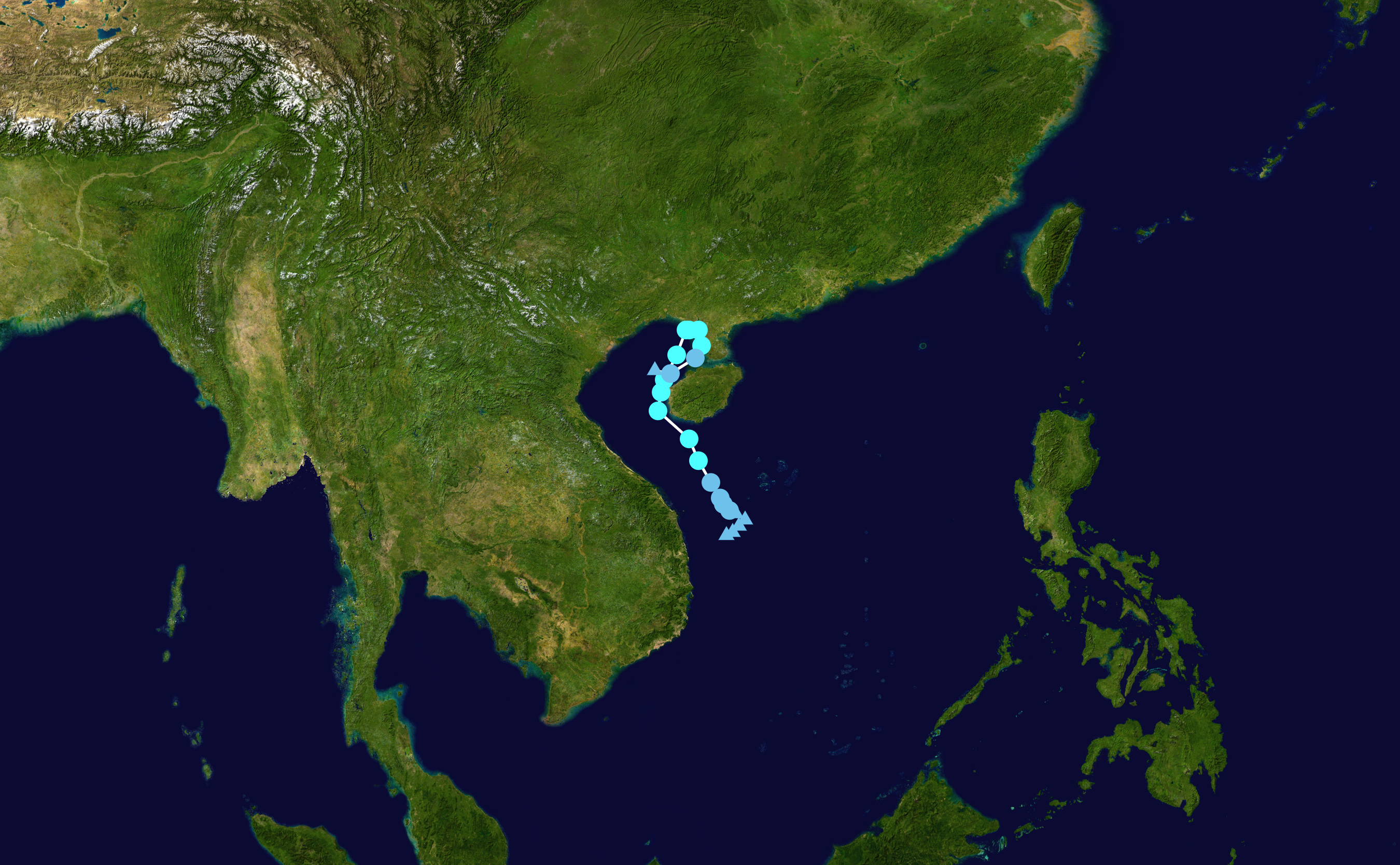
- Duration: October 17 – October 20
- Peak intensity: 75 km/h (45 mph) (10-min); 1000 hPa (mbar)

On October 13, a low-pressure area developed to the west of the Philippines. Deep convection broadened over its partially-exposed LLCC with weak rainbands. Due to the system being over warm waters and low vertical wind shear, a TCFA was announced on October 16. The following day, the system was marked as a tropical depression by the JMA, east of Vietnam. The JTWC subsequently followed suit, designating it as 16W. Infrared satellite imagery depicted a CDO obscuring the circulation of the ragged tropical depression. It was upgraded to a tropical storm later the next day, receiving the name Sanba. A deep-layer southerly flow began to significantly influence the storm after shearing upper and mid-level clouds. Sanba made landfall on Hainan on October 19. Sanba accelerated north-northeastward, while aided by warm waters, with overshooting tops scattering radially aloft. With an exposed LLCC, Sanba weakened into a tropical depression on October 20.

The precursor of Sanba caused heavy rainfall and triggered flooding in Central Vietnam, damage totaled at 548.6 billion đồng (US$22.4 million). In China, four people were reported dead and total damage reached 5.82 billion yuan (US$796 million).

=== Tropical Depression 17W ===
- Tropical depression (JMA)
- Tropical depression (SSHWS)
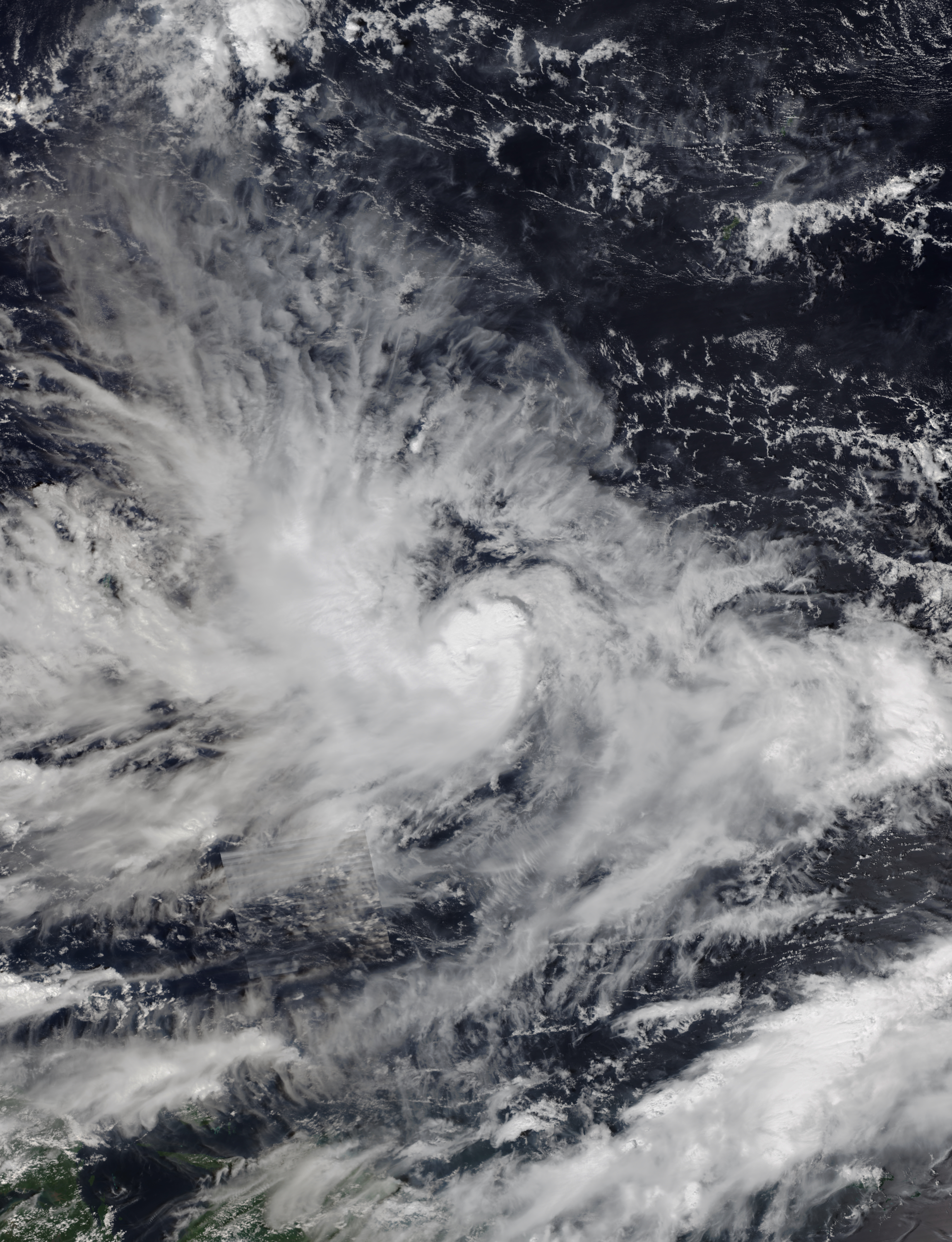
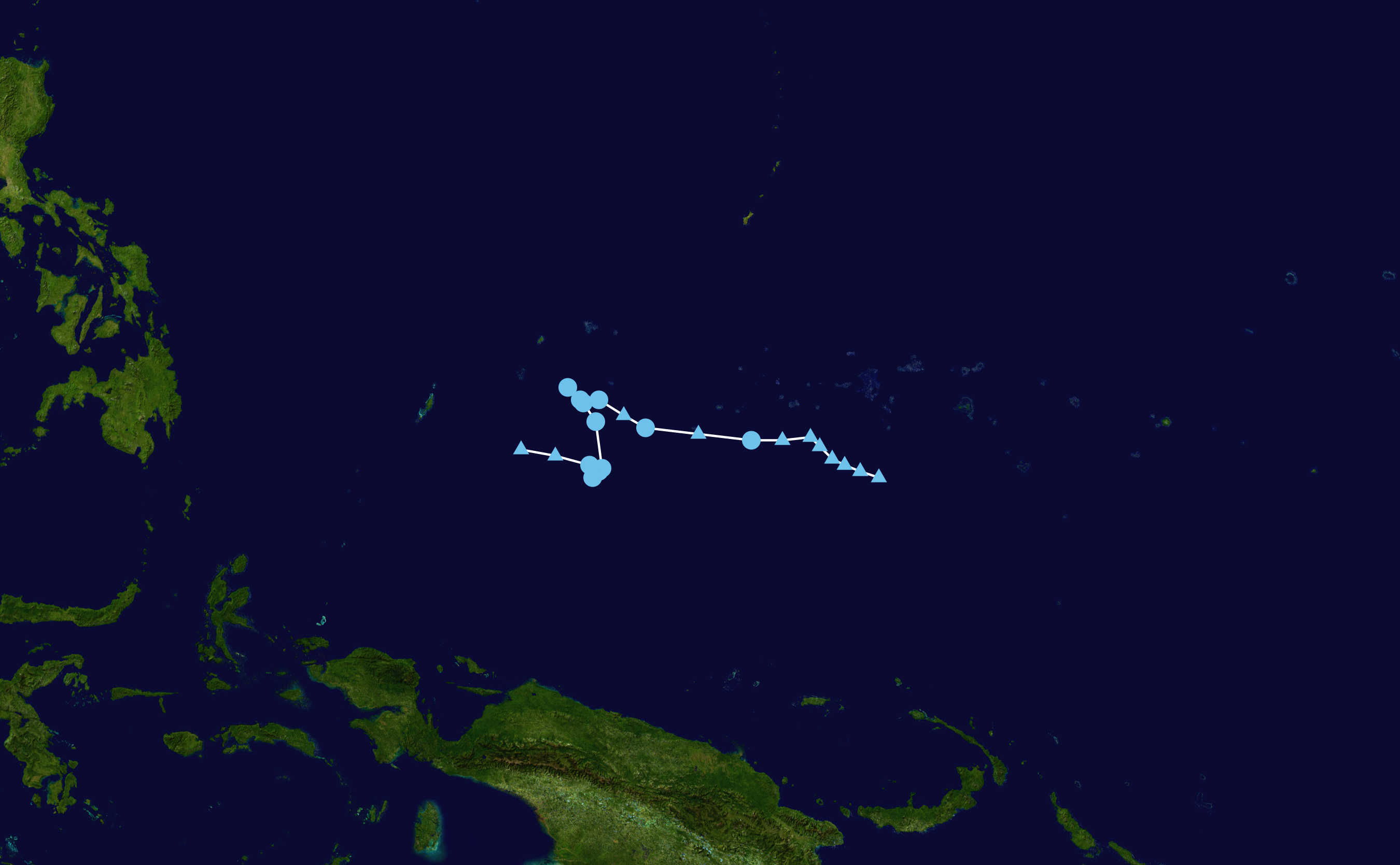
- Duration: November 12 – November 17
- Peak intensity: 55 km/h (35 mph) (10-min); 1004 hPa (mbar)

After weeks of inactivity, a tropical depression formed east of Palau on November 12. Although with disorganized and deep convection to the north, the system underwent development from diffluence, low to moderate vertical wind shear, and warm sea surface temperatures of 30 °C (86 °F). Shortly after, the JTWC issued a TCFA for what was then-Invest 95W. At 15:00 UTC, the agency designated it as 17W. As the depression was 330 km (205 mi) of Yap, a small CDO emerged, obscuring the LLCC. However, development was hindered by easterly wind shear and dry air in the mid-level of the troposphere. In addition, the deepest convection was displaced to the western and southern portions of the LLCC. By November 13, the JTWC noted that the system had dissipated due to strong wind shear as it was heading towards the equator. The JMA however, kept monitoring the depression around that time. On November 17, the JMA finally stopped monitoring the system as a tropical depression at 06:00 UTC, labeling it as a low-pressure area.

=== Tropical Storm Jelawat (Kabayan) ===
- Tropical storm (JMA)
- Tropical depression (SSHWS)
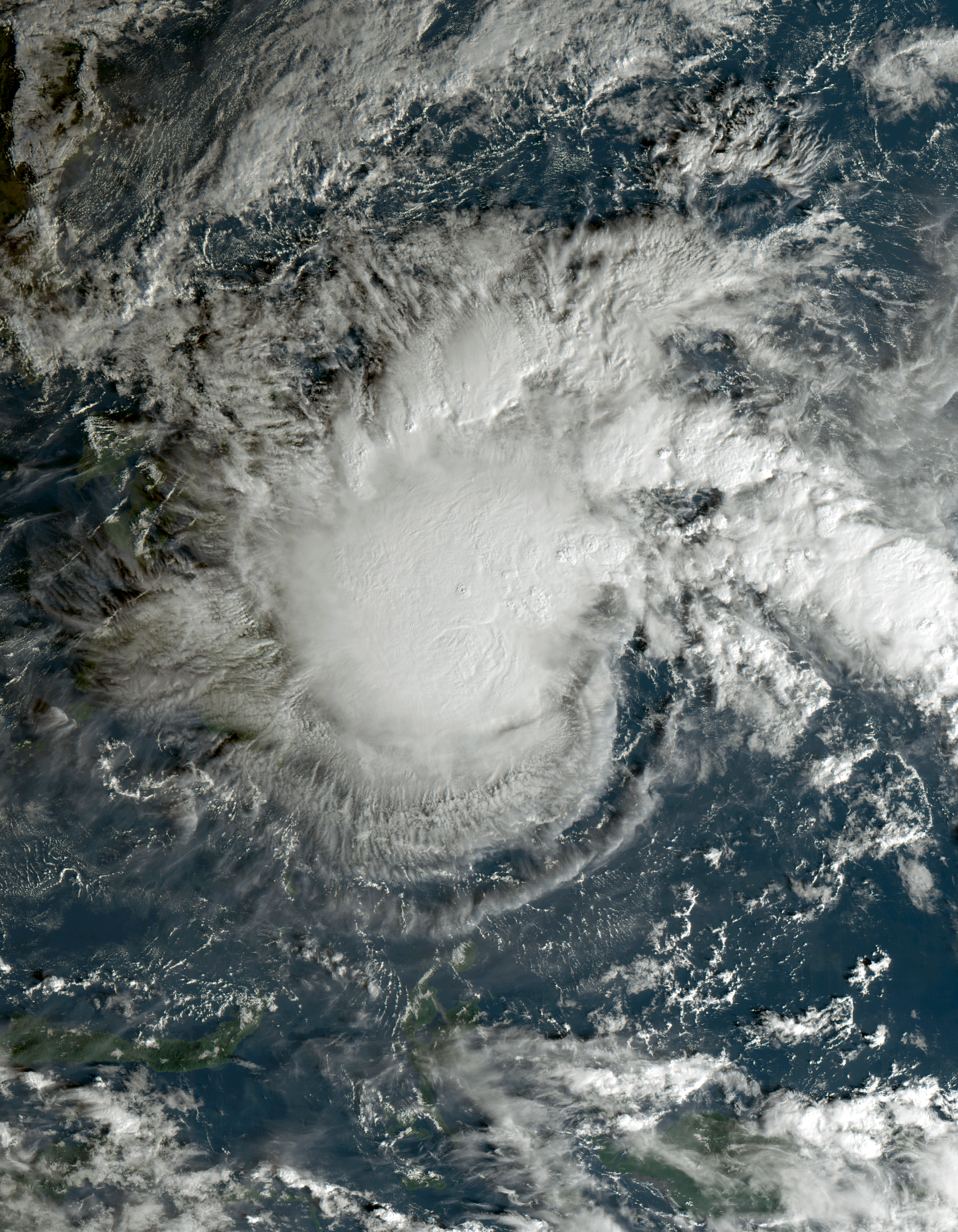
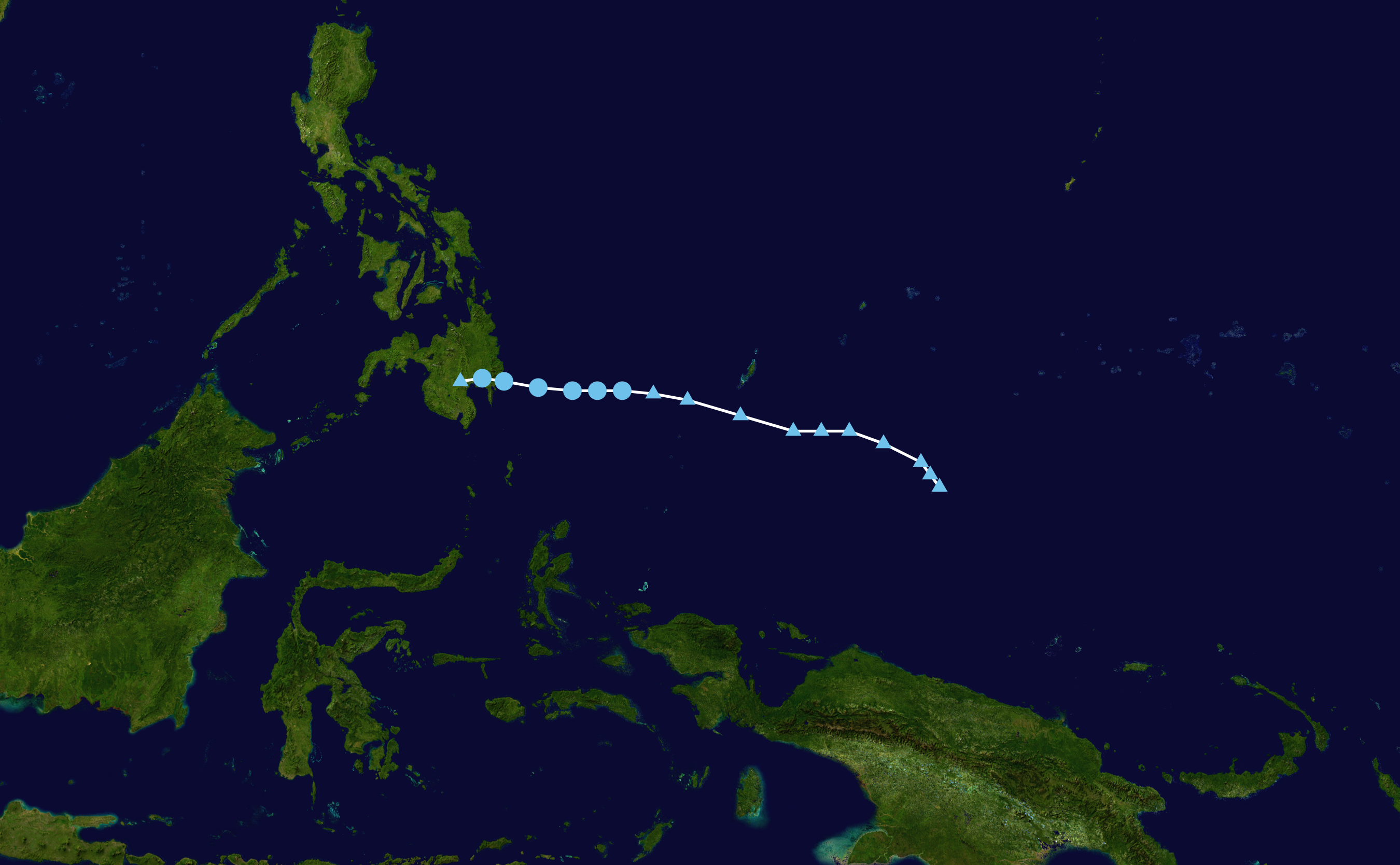
- Duration: December 15 – December 18
- Peak intensity: 65 km/h (40 mph) (10-min); 1002 hPa (mbar)

On December 13, the JTWC began to monitor an area of convection approximately 1,154 km (717 mi) east-southeast of Yap. The disturbance had convection scattered over the west and south side of a broad LLCC. Later that day, the JMA began monitoring the disturbance, labeling it as a low-pressure area. Conditions for tropical cyclogenesis remained marginally conducive with sea surface temperatures of 30–31 °C (86–88 °F) and low vertical wind shear subdued by westward outflow aloft. On December 15, the JMA recognized the system as a tropical depression. The next day, the depression entered the PAR, resulting in PAGASA naming the depression Kabayan. On December 17, the system had intensified into a tropical storm, earning the name Jelawat from the JMA. At 09:30 PHT (01:30 UTC) the next day, Jelawat made landfall in Manay, Davao Oriental, weakening into a tropical depression. The JTWC later issued its last bulletin on the system, stating that land interaction and lack of humidity had made the depression rapidly weaken. On December 20, the JTWC would begin to monitor the remnants of Jelawat, stating that it was in a marginally favorable environment for regeneration. The JMA would last monitor Jelawat at 18:00 UTC that day. The JTWC would still monitor the remnants until they dissipated on December 22.

When Jelawat impacted the Philippines, it would cause heavy rainfall throughout Mindanao and Visayas, resulting in nearly 90,000 people being evacuated. One person would be injured while another would go missing. Jelawat would cause nearly US$40,000 in damages.

=== Other systems ===
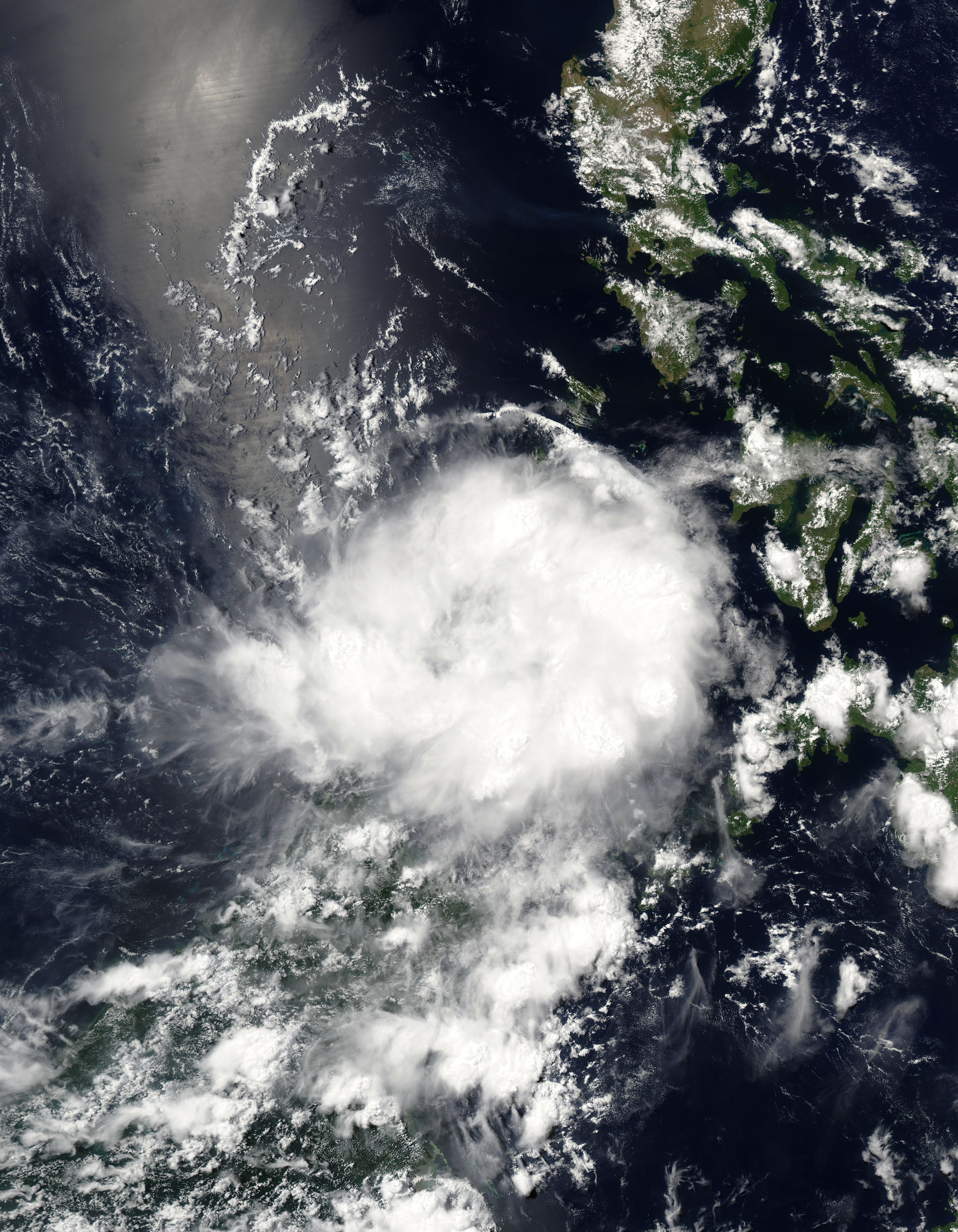
A tropical depression over Palawan on May 5.

- On February 20, the JMA tracked a weak tropical depression to the northeast of Luzon, Philippines. The system persisted until the next day when it got absorbed by a stationary front.
- According to the JMA, a tropical depression formed to the east of Singapore on March 4. It was designated 98S by the JTWC shortly afterwards, due to the agency analyzing the system as being located within the Southern Hemisphere. The system was last noted on March 7. 50,000 people were affected in Malaysia from the floods produced by the system, which also killed four people.
- On May 1, a tropical disturbance persisted around 740 km (460 mi) east of Davao City and had fragmented but organized rainbands to the north and west of its circulation center. The convection continued to broaden as it wrapped the disorganized LLCC. However, land interaction with the Philippines and the system's weak structure hindered further development, despite being in favorable environmental conditions. On May 5, the JMA classified the disturbance as a tropical depression. However, dry air and a weak outflow aloft showed that the depression had very little development, all while tracking west-northwestward. The depression would dissipate on May 7.
- On June 7, the JMA detected a broad area of circulation associated with a tropical disturbance north of Hainan. The agency dubbed it a tropical depression shortly after. However, by the next day, the system moved over China and the circulation center began deteriorating. The system was last noted on 18:00 UTC of June 11. Persistent rainfall in Guangxi caused the Baisha River to flood multiple villages in Hepu County. Firefighters used boats to rescue residents trapped in their homes. A total of 2,603 people required evacuation. On June 9, Vietnam's National Center for Hydrometeorological Forecasting (NCHMF) issued a "Potential Tropical Depression Alert" in the Gulf of Tonkin, warning the resurgence of this tropical depression but would stop monitoring the system a day later.
- On August 3, a tropical depression formed to the west of Hainan. The system weakened on August 4. It brought heavy rainfall and landslides in Northern Vietnam from August 2–6. Total damage reached 1.378 trillion (US$58.2 miliion).
- On August 3, the JTWC marked a subtropical depression east of Japan. It erratically moved north till August 5, where it moved to the east and dissipated
- On August 19, a tropical depression formed to the southeast of Japan. The system dissipated on August 21.
- On September 2, the JTWC designated a subtropical depression north of Kure Atoll, with them upgrading it to a subtropical storm 6 hours later, with it being downgraded back to SD a day later. It moved to the west before drifting to the south and dissipating.
- On September 3, a tropical depression formed before dissipating a day later due to high wind shear.
- On September 4, the JMA started tracking a depression that originated from the tail-end of Tropical Storm Kirogi. The system was last noted on 06:00 UTC of September 6.
- On September 10, a tropical depression formed near the Ryukyu Islands. It meandered around the area for a few days before turning south and then northwest toward Taiwan. The system dissipated on September 14.
- The JMA briefly tracked a tropical depression that persisted to the northeast of the Mariana Islands on September 12.
- On September 13, the JTWC designated a subtropical depression east of Japan. It then meandered north to northeast till September 15 where it dissipated.

== Storm names ==
Within the Northwest Pacific Ocean, both the Japan Meteorological Agency (JMA) and the Philippine Atmospheric, Geophysical and Astronomical Services Administration (PAGASA) assign names to tropical cyclones that develop in the Western Pacific, which can result in a tropical cyclone having two names. The Japan Meteorological Agency's RSMC Tokyo — Typhoon Center assigns international names to tropical cyclones on behalf of the World Meteorological Organization's Typhoon Committee, should they be judged to have 10-minute sustained windspeeds of 65 km/h (40 mph).

PAGASA names to tropical cyclones which move into or form as a tropical depression in their area of responsibility located between 135°E and 115°E and between 5°N and 25°N even if the cyclone has had an international name assigned to it. The names of significant tropical cyclones are retired, by both PAGASA and the Typhoon Committee. Should the list of names for the Philippine region be exhausted then names will be taken from an auxiliary list of which the first ten are published each season. Unused names are marked in gray. The names of significant tropical cyclones will be retired by both PAGASA and the Typhoon Committee in the spring of 2024.

=== International names ===
During the season, 17 tropical storms developed in the Western Pacific and 16 of them were named by the JMA once they had 10-minute sustained winds of 65 km/h (40 mph). The JMA selected the names from a list of 140 names that had been developed by the 14 members nations and territories of the ESCAP/WMO Typhoon Committee. During the season, the names Yun-yeung and Koinu were used for the first time after they replaced Kai-tak and Tembin which were retired following the 2017 season.

| Sanvu | Mawar | Guchol | Talim | Doksuri | Khanun | Lan | Saola |
| Damrey | Haikui | Kirogi | Yun-yeung | Koinu | Bolaven | Sanba | Jelawat |

- Additionally, Dora entered the Western Pacific basin from the Central Pacific basin after crossing the International Date Line (180°E) as a tropical cyclone. As the system crossed between basins intact, it retained the name assigned to it by the National Hurricane Center.

==== Retirement ====
At their 56th Session in February 2024, the ESCAP/WMO Typhoon Committee announced that the names Doksuri, Saola and Haikui would be removed from the naming lists for the Western Pacific due to the number of deaths and amount of damages each one caused, and they will not be used again for another typhoon name. In 2025, they were replaced by Bori, Saobien, and Tianma respectively.

=== Philippines ===
Main list
| Amang | Betty | Chedeng | Dodong | Egay |
| Falcon | Goring | Hanna | Ineng | Jenny |
| Kabayan | Liwayway (unused) | Marilyn (unused) | Nimfa (unused) | Onyok (unused) |
| Perla (unused) | Quiel (unused) | Ramon (unused) | Sarah (unused) | Tamaraw (unused) |
| Ugong (unused) | Viring (unused) | Weng (unused) | Yoyoy (unused) | Zigzag (unused) |
Auxiliary list
| Abe (unused) | Berto (unused) | Charo (unused) | Dado (unused) | Estoy (unused) |
| Felion (unused) | Gening (unused) | Herman (unused) | Irma (unused) | Jaime (unused) |

The 2023 season was tied with both the 1998 and 2010 seasons as the most inactive typhoon season for the Philippines, with only 11 tropical cyclones forming within or crossing the Philippine Area of Responsibility (PAR). During the season, PAGASA used its own naming scheme for the tropical cyclones that either developed within or moved into their self-defined area of responsibility. This was the same list used during 2019 and are scheduled to be used again during 2027. All of the names are the same except Tamaraw and Ugong which replaced the names Tisoy and Ursula after they were retired.

==== Retirement ====
On January 19, 2024, PAGASA announced that the names Egay and Goring would be retired from the naming list, after they both caused over ₱1 billion in damages to the Philippines. They were replaced on the naming list with the names Emil and Gavino respectively for the 2027 season.

== Season effects ==
This table summarizes all the systems that were active in the North Pacific Ocean, west of the International Date Line, during 2023. It also provides an overview of each system's intensity, duration, land areas affected, and any associated deaths or damages..

| Name | Dates | Peak intensity | | | Areas affected | Damage (USD) | Deaths | Ref(s). |
| Name | Dates | Category | Wind speed | Pressure | Areas affected | Damage (USD) | Deaths | Ref(s). |
|---|---|---|---|---|---|---|---|---|
| TD | February 20–21 | Tropical depression | Not specified | 1008 hPa (29.77 inHg) | None | None | 0 None | |
| TD | March 4–7 | Tropical depression | 55 km/h (35 mph) | 1008 hPa (29.77 inHg) | Brunei, Indonesia, Malaysia, Singapore | Unknown | 4 | |
| Amang | April 10–13 | Tropical depression | 55 km/h (35 mph) | 1004 hPa (29.65 inHg) | Palau, Philippines | $223,000 | None | |
| Sanvu | April 19–22 | Tropical storm | 85 km/h (50 mph) | 996 hPa (29.41 inHg) | Federated States of Micronesia | None | None | |
| TD | May 5–7 | Tropical depression | Not specified | 1004 hPa (29.65 inHg) | Philippines | None | None | |
| Mawar (Betty) | May 19 – June 2 | Violent typhoon | 215 km/h (130 mph) | 900 hPa (26.58 inHg) | Federated States of Micronesia, Guam, Northern Mariana Islands, Philippines, Ryukyu Islands | $4.3 billion | 6 | |
| Guchol (Chedeng) | June 6–12 | Typhoon | 150 km/h (90 mph) | 960 hPa (28.35 inHg) | Philippines, Japan, Alaska | None | None | |
| TD | June 7–11 | Tropical depression | Not specified | 1000 hPa (29.53 inHg) | South China, Vietnam | None | None | |
| Talim (Dodong) | July 13–18 | Severe tropical storm | 110 km/h (70 mph) | 970 hPa (28.64 inHg) | Philippines, South China, Vietnam | $364 million | 3 | |
| Doksuri (Egay) | July 20–30 | Very strong typhoon | 185 km/h (115 mph) | 925 hPa (27.32 inHg) | Palau, Philippines, Taiwan, China | $28.6 billion | 137 | |
| Khanun (Falcon) | July 26 – August 10 | Very strong typhoon | 175 km/h (110 mph) | 930 hPa (27.46 inHg) | Philippines, Taiwan, Japan, South Korea, North Korea, Russia | $268 million | 13 | |
| TD | August 3–4 | Tropical depression | Not specified | 1002 hPa (29.59 inHg) | South China, Vietnam | $58.2 million | 15 | |
| Lan | August 7–17 | Very strong typhoon | 165 km/h (105 mph) | 940 hPa (27.76 inHg) | Bonin Islands, Japan | $500 million | 1 | |
| Dora | August 12–21 | Typhoon | 140 km/h (85 mph) | 980 hPa (28.94 inHg) | Wake Island (after crossover) | None | None | |
| TD | August 19–21 | Tropical depression | Not specified | 1004 hPa (29.65 inHg) | None | None | None | |
| Saola (Goring) | August 22 – September 3 | Violent typhoon | 195 km/h (120 mph) | 920 hPa (27.17 inHg) | Philippines, South China, Macau, Taiwan, Hong Kong, Northern Vietnam | $1.35 billion | 3 | |
| Damrey | August 23–29 | Severe tropical storm | 95 km/h (60 mph) | 985 hPa (29.09 inHg) | Alaska | None | None | |
| Haikui (Hanna) | August 27 – September 6 | Very strong typhoon | 155 km/h (100 mph) | 945 hPa (27.91 inHg) | Northern Mariana Islands, Taiwan, Philippines, China, Hong Kong | $2.55 billion | 16 | |
| Kirogi | August 29 – September 6 | Tropical storm | 85 km/h (50 mph) | 994 hPa (29.35 inHg) | Japan | None | None | |
| TD | September 2–3 | Tropical depression | Not specified | 1002 hPa (29.59 inHg) | None | None | None | |
| Yun-yeung (Ineng) | September 4–9 | Tropical storm | 75 km/h (45 mph) | 998 hPa (29.47 inHg) | Japan | $300 million | 3 | |
| TD | September 4–6 | Tropical depression | Not specified | 1010 hPa (29.83 inHg) | None | None | None | |
| TD | September 10 – 14 | Tropical depression | Not specified | 1004 hPa (29.65 inHg) | None | None | None | |
| TD | September 12 | Tropical depression | Not specified | 1004 hPa (29.65 inHg) | None | None | None | |
| 13W | September 24 – 27 | Tropical depression | Not specified | 1000 hPa (29.53 inHg) | Vietnam | $44.3 million | 10 | |
| Koinu (Jenny) | September 28 – October 9 | Very strong typhoon | 165 km/h (105 mph) | 940 hPa (27.76 inHg) | Northern Mariana Islands, Philippines, Taiwan, South China, Hong Kong | $28.9 million | 1 | |
| Bolaven | October 6–14 | Violent typhoon | 215 km/h (130 mph) | 905 hPa (26.72 inHg) | Federated States of Micronesia, Guam, Northern Mariana Islands, Bonin Islands | Minimal | None | |
| Sanba | October 17–20 | Tropical storm | 75 km/h (45 mph) | 1000 hPa (29.53 inHg) | Vietnam, South China | $818 million | 7 | |
| 17W | November 12–17 | Tropical depression | 55 km/h (35 mph) | 1004 hPa (29.65 inHg) | None | None | None | |
| Jelawat (Kabayan) | December 15–18 | Tropical storm | 65 km/h (40 mph) | 1002 hPa (29.59 inHg) | Palau, Philippines, Borneo | $43,200 | 0 (1) | |
Season aggregates
| 30 systems | February 20 – December 18 | | 215 km/h (130 mph) | 900 hPa (26.58 inHg) | | $38.9 billion | 219 | |

== See also ==
- Weather of 2023
- Tropical cyclones in 2023
- Pacific typhoon season
- 2023 Atlantic hurricane season
- 2023 Pacific hurricane season
- 2023 North Indian Ocean cyclone season
- South-West Indian Ocean cyclone seasons: 2022–23, 2023–24
- Australian region cyclone seasons: 2022–23, 2023–24
- South Pacific cyclone seasons: 2022–23, 2023–24
