= Royal Navy during the Second World War =

The Royal Navy during the Second World War played a crucial role in the Allied victory. Its main tasks included the protection of merchant ships in the Atlantic against German U-boats and the defence of British territories but the conflict exposed its vulnerabilities and marked a turning point in naval history.

Facing early setbacks and defeat, including the loss of capital ships, the Royal Navy struggled with new threats such as powerful German U-boats, Italian and Japanese surface raiders, and devastating naval air power.

Throughout the war, the Navy encountered persistent problems in protecting convoys from submarine attacks and adapting to rapidly evolving naval technology. Its greatest successes included the victory over the Italians in the Battle of Cape Matapan, the naval battle off the North Cape and the evacuation of the British Expeditionary Force from Dunkirk.

The war catalyzed significant technical developments, most notably the emergence of the aircraft carrier as the dominant warship, eclipsing the battleship's long-held supremacy in fleet operations. By the end of the war, the immense expansion of the United States Navy had overtaken the Royal Navy’s position as the world’s most powerful maritime force, signaling a shift in global naval dominance.

== Background ==
At the beginning of the Second World War, the Royal Navy was the strongest navy in the world. It had 20 battleships and battlecruisers ready for service or under construction, twelve aircraft carriers, over 90 light and heavy cruisers, 70 submarines, over 100 destroyers as well as numerous escort ships, minelayers, minesweepers and 232 aircraft. However, the British were faced with the strategic problem of protecting their huge empire. At least at the start of the war, there was no comprehensive strategy, as British naval objectives were the same as they had been since the battle against Napoleon - to keep open global transport and communication routes by establishing and maintaining naval supremacy in the North Sea, Atlantic and Mediterranean. In return, the Kriegsmarine initially had two battleships, two obsolete pre-dreadnoughts, three pocket battleships, two heavy cruisers, six light cruisers, 61 U-boats, 21 destroyers and 42 other ships such as minesweepers, torpedoes and speedboats at its disposal.

== History ==
=== 1939 ===
On 3 September at 11:17, seventeen minutes after the British ultimatum to Germany to withdraw from Poland had expired, the Royal Navy entered the war. It set up the blockade of Germany restricting supplies by sea to Germany. In September the aircraft carrier HMS Courageous was sunk while on anti-submarine patrol and in October the battleship HMS Royal Oak was sunk in the protected anchorage of Scapa Flow by a German submarine. The first major battle between the Kriegsmarine and the Royal Navy took place off the coast of South America on 13 December. There, a squadron of three cruisers under the command of Commodore Henry Harwood encountered the heavy cruiser (described as a "pocket battleship") the Admiral Graf Spee. Despite superior firepower - the British ships were all badly damaged - the German ship withdrew to the harbour of Montevideo. After four days, during which the British demanded the internment of the Admiral Graf Spee by Uruguay, believing escape to be impossible the ship was sunk by the Germans.

=== 1940 ===
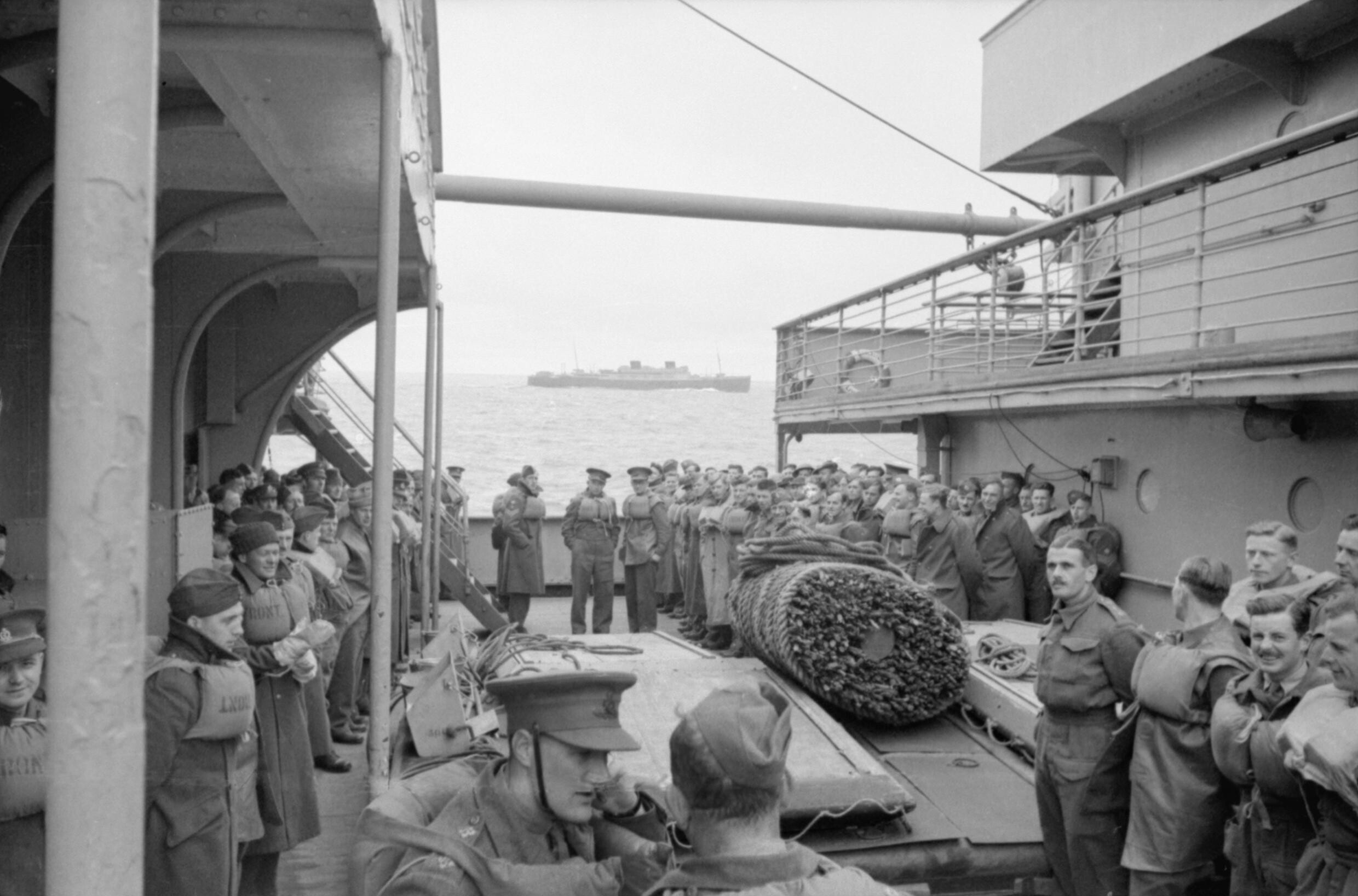
British troops evacuated from Norway on Lancastria, June 1940

During the German invasion of Norway, there were battles off Narvik on 10 and 13 April, in which 10 German destroyers (half the German destroyer fleet) was destroyed. On 10 May 1940, the German Wehrmacht began the Western Campaign. Due to the rapid advance, the British Expeditionary Corps was forced to retreat to Dunkirk. On 26 May, Winston Churchill ordered the evacuation of the surrounded troops. In an unprecedented show of strength, the Royal Navy was able to provide over 800 ships rescuing over 300,000 soldiers bring them safely to England by 4 June. In addition to the threat posed by the Kriegsmarine in the Atlantic, the Royal Navy was confronted with a second front in the Mediterranean following Italy's declaration of war on 10 June. The British saw Italy as a second-class military power. But unlike the Royal Navy, the Regia Marina with its six battleships, seven heavy cruisers, twelve light cruisers, 120 destroyers and torpedo boats and 115 submarines was concentrated in the Mediterranean. After the Royal Navy had destroyed the French battleships in Mers-el-Kébir on 3 July as part of Operation Catapult in order to prevent them from falling into German hands, the first battle between the Italians and British took place six days later off Punto Stilo. The battle ended in a draw. Further smaller clashes followed until November, which the British were able to win. During the attack on Taranto on 11 and 12 November, the British were able to deal a heavy blow to the Italian navy. On 27 November, the last major clash of 1940 took place in the naval battle at Cape Teulada; however, it ended without a victor.

=== 1941 ===
At the beginning of 1941, the Royal Navy was confronted with the increasing threat posed by German U-boats. By the beginning of the year, Great Britain had lost almost 4 million tonnes of cargo. The destroyers were too slow and the technology used was not fully developed. The sonar, called Asdic by the British, only had a range of 1,300 metres; bearing and distance could not be read correctly and it was almost impossible to distinguish between submarines and surface units. To intensify the attacks on British merchant ships, the Kriegsmarine launched the Operation Rheinübung in May with the battleship Bismarck and the heavy cruiser Prinz Eugen.

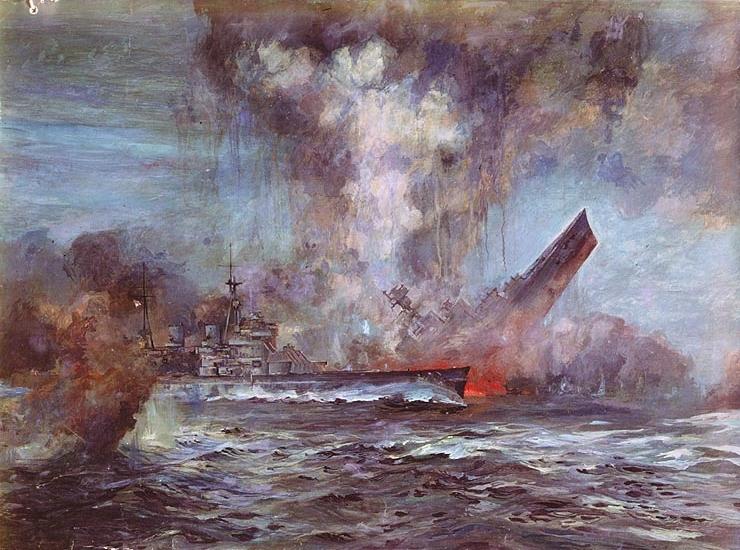
HMS Hood sinks after hit by the German battleship Bismarck

At 05:35 on the morning of 24 May, the German ships were sighted by the battlecruiser Hood and the battleship Prince of Wales. After the distance had been reduced to 23 kilometres, the battle began at 05:52 with the Hood opening fire. However, the Hood initially mistook the Prinz Eugen for the Bismarck. While the British struggled to fire their guns, one of the German ships hit the Hood, causing a rapidly spreading fire amidships. Then, at around 06:00 in the morning, a huge explosion caused the Hood to break in two and sink within minutes. All but three of the 1,418 crew members were killed. The Prince of Wales continued the battle, but was hit several times before breaking off and retreating behind a wall of smoke. As the Bismarck had also taken a hit, damaging some of her fuel tanks, she was tracked down by the British due to leaking oil and eventually sunk, taking most of her crew with her.

In the Mediterranean, the hope that the Italians could be defeated quickly faded. In fact, Italy went on the offensive at the Battle of Cape Matapan, but was defeated by the Royal Navy. For the majority of the year, the Italian forces merely escorted supply convoys. It was not until the end of the year that major fighting resumed with the First Naval Engagement in the Gulf of Syrte, which ended inconclusively. By now, Britain was not only fighting Nazi Germany alone (due to the collapse of the Western Front in May 1940 and the loss of France as an ally), but was also heavily engaged in the Mediterranean and the Middle East, which meant a complete reversal of pre-war strategic priorities, whereby the Mediterranean had to be abandoned if necessary in order to concentrate a large battle fleet and send it to East Asia.

In August 1941, when the dual demands of the Atlantic and the Mediterranean were already severely overstretching the Navy's resources in terms of all types of ships, there was a danger of a Japanese attack on Singapore, the Royal Navy's base in East Asia. On 3 December, even before Japan declared war on 7 December, Britain sent the Prince of Wales and the Repulse to Singapore with their destroyer escort. Their loss on 9 December marked the end of another difficult year for the Royal Navy.

=== 1942 ===
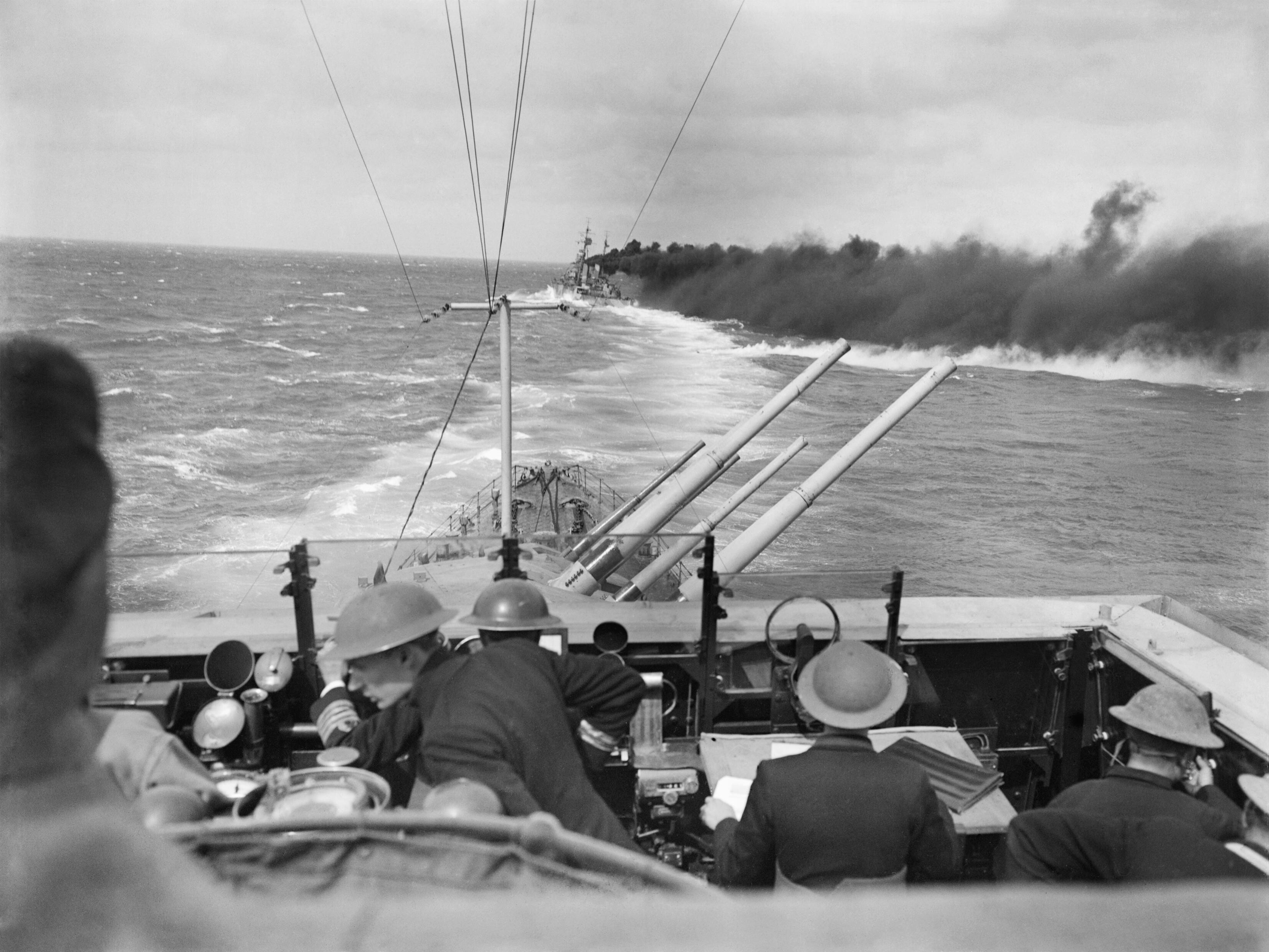
Royal Navy Convoy From Alexandria To Malta Meets and Engages Italian Warships in the Mediterranean, 22 March 1942

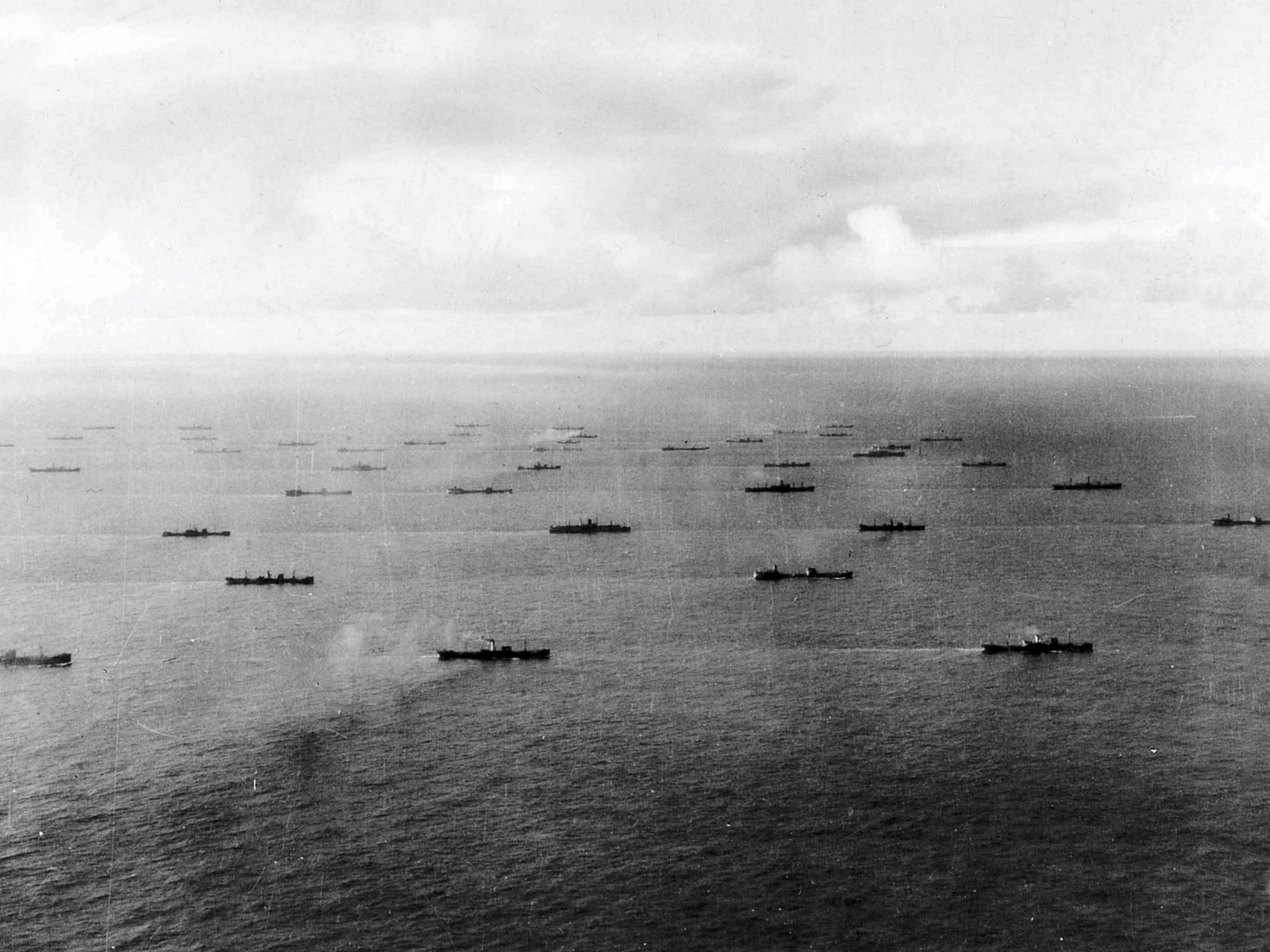
Allied convoy near Iceland, 1942

The year 1942 began as the previous had ended. In the Atlantic, the amount of cargo destroyed in the first four months had risen to almost one million tons. To make matters worse, the Royal Navy, now in Ceylon, was confronted with the temporarily most powerful navy in the world after the loss of Singapore at the end of February. Shaken by this severe blow, the War Cabinet hurriedly reinforced the Eastern Fleet so that, by the end of March 1942, it had five battleships, two fleet carriers (Indomitable and Formidable), the older carrier Hermes, seven cruisers, sixteen destroyers and seven submarines.
In the Mediterranean, Malta faced an ever-increasing siege. In order to maintain supplies to the island, the British deployed large flotillas to escort convoys to Malta. In March, the Second Sea Battle in the Gulf of Syrte took place, which ended with the defeat of the Axis powers. The British victory was followed by a serious setback in June and August during Operations Vigorous, Harpoon and Pedestal. The year ended with the capture of Madagascar, which strengthened the Royal Navy's position in the Indian Ocean.

=== 1943 ===
In the early days of 1943, the Royal Navy faced a significant challenge in the Atlantic. The fuel crisis and shortage of ships and escorts posed a serious threat to the Navy's operations. Following the extensive decryption of the Enigma with four cylinders in January and the introduction of air-to-ground radar in March, as well as the conversion of convoy protection, the tide began to turn in favour of the British. After the defeat in North Africa in November of the previous year and the conquest of Sicily in July and August, Italy was eliminated as an opponent in the war. Following the conclusion of armistice negotiations in September, Italy joined the Allied forces. Concurrently, the Italian Navy occupied the islands of Milos, Limnos, Chios, Skyros, Rhodes and the majority of Crete.

=== 1944 ===
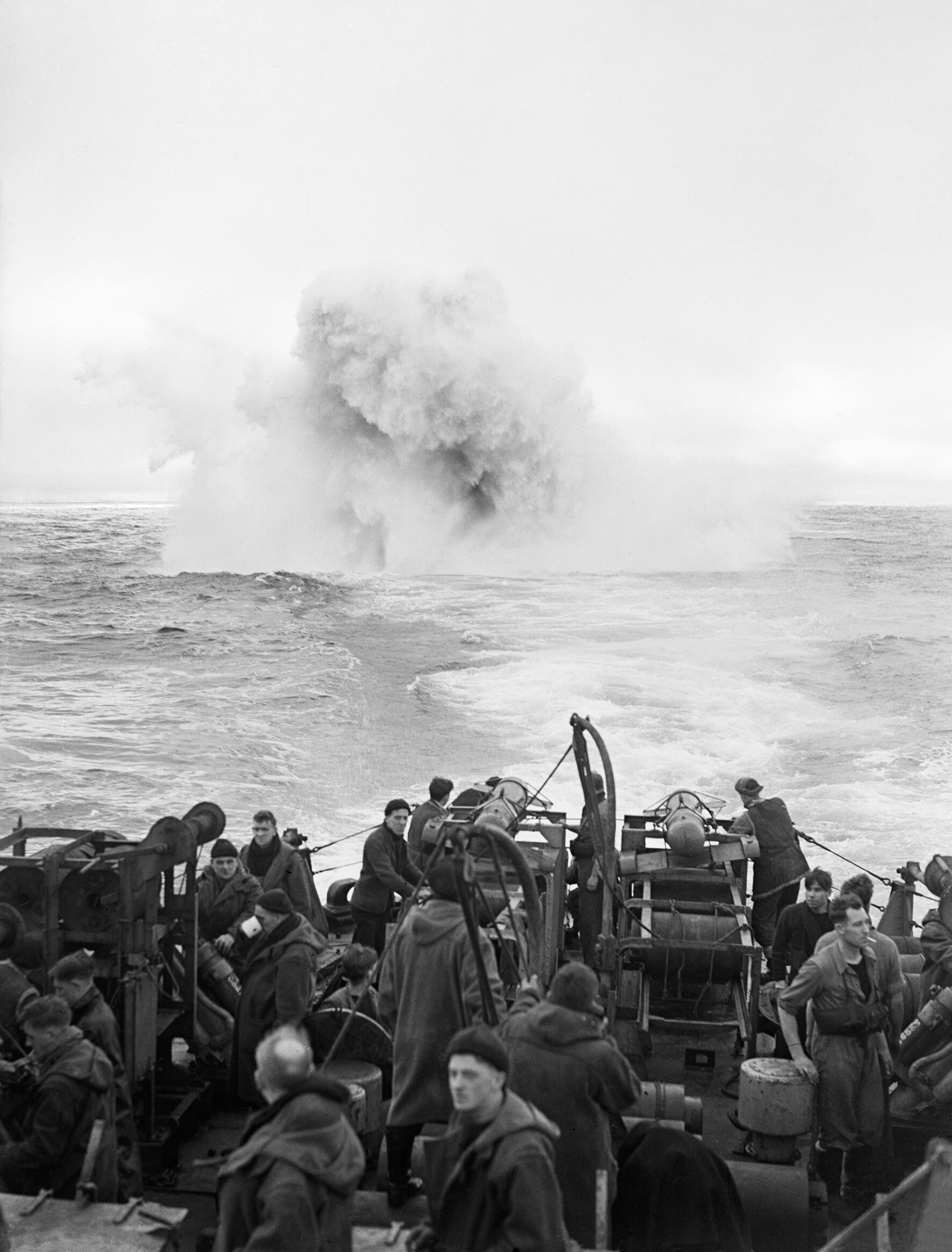
Depth charges detonate astern of the sloop HMS Starling. She participated in the sinking of 14 U-boats throughout the war

In the penultimate year of the war, the Royal Navy was on the advance on all fronts. In the Indian Ocean, it was able to decisively weaken and push back the Japanese in several operations by attacking Sumatra and Java. In the Mediterranean, the Royal Navy was able to sink half of all captured Italian torpedo boats by the end of the year. At the same time, it supported the Allied landings in Lazio as part of Operation Shingle. In addition, the Admiralty prepared for the Normandy landings. Neptune was the last operation of global significance to be commanded by the Royal Navy. Of the almost 6,500 ships, 70 per cent were provided by the British. The Royal Navy went on to take part in several operations to liberate France and the Netherlands.

=== 1945 ===
In Europe, the war ended for the Royal Navy with the surrender of the German U-boat fleet by Karl Dönitz on 4 May. Already agreed the previous year, the British Pacific Fleet became part of the US 5th Fleet in the Pacific in March as Task Force 57 and was entrusted with flank defence during Operation Iceberg. From late March to May, it successfully neutralised the Japanese airfields on the Sakishima Islands and Taiwan. In July and August, now as part of the US 3rd Fleet, she strafed Hitachi, Nojima Saki, Shionomisaki, Shimizu, Hamamatsu and Kamaishi. The shelling of a musical instrument factory by the King George V on 29 July ended the Royal Navy's war operations.

== Aftermath ==
Over the course of the six years of war, naval losses totalled 50,000 dead, 15,000 wounded and 7,500 prisoners of war. The war had devastating consequences for the United Kingdom and the Royal Navy in particular. After 1945, the United States Navy had replaced the Royal Navy as the strongest navy in the world. Due to the overextension of British economic power, the government was no longer able to maintain such a large fleet. By the time the war with Japan came to an end, the demobilisation of the armed forces had already begun. Of the almost 900 major combat units (frigates and larger ships, including submarines) that were available in August 1945, fewer than 300 were active after the war. By the end of the 1940s, the total active strength had been reduced to 80 ships.

== Command, control and organisation ==
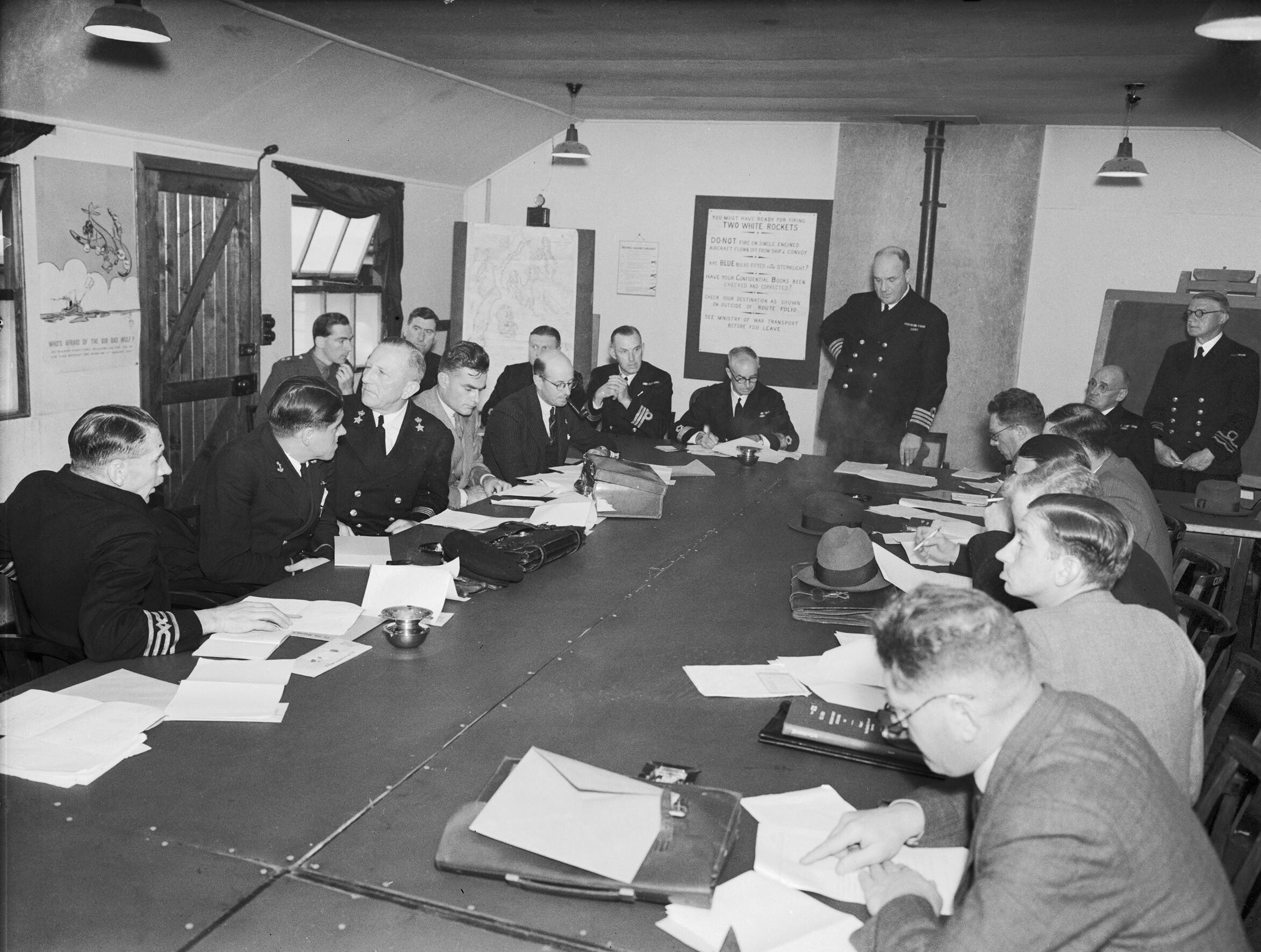
A convoy conference in progress, August 1942

The Royal Navy was commanded by the Admiralty since 1707. During the Second World War, it consisted of two departments, the Department of Permanent Secretary and the Admiralty Naval Staff. The Department of Permanent Secretary was an agency of the Civil Service and was responsible for the control, direction and management of all administrative functions of the Admiralty. It was under the direction of the Permanent Secretary to the Admiralty. The Admiralty Naval Staff was responsible for advising and assisting the Board of Admiralty in the development of strategic and operational measures, the deployment of the fleet and the allocation and procurement of resources. The Naval Staff was composed of a number of subdivisions, all under the overall supervision of the First Sea Lord.

=== Fleets and Commands ===
In 1939 the Royal Navy was organized into the following commands: The Home Fleet at Portsmouth, Devonport and Chatham. The Mediterranean Fleet at Malta, Gibraltar and Alexandria, the China Station at Hong Kong, the East Indies Station at Singapore, the American Station at Bermuda, the African Station at Simonstown, and the West Indies Station at Jamaica. With the beginning of the war the North and South Atlantic Commands were formed. Additionally there were six home commands placed around the British Islands at Shetland, Rosyth, Nore, Dover, Portsmouth and Plymouth.

=== Recruitment ===
Thanks to the National Service Act of 1939, the majority of the Royal Navy consisted of conscripts. However, there was always a voluntary element to naval recruitment during the war - those conscripted could volunteer to join the navy. The three main reasons for serving in the Royal Navy were: The search for adventure, prestige, and better provision compared to the British Army or Royal Air Force. The selection of men joining the Navy was done by the Ministry of Labour and National Service, who decided who should remain civilians and who should be called up for conscription. However, as the demand for men steadily increased, the physical and mental requirements were reduced to a minimum from 1943 onwards.

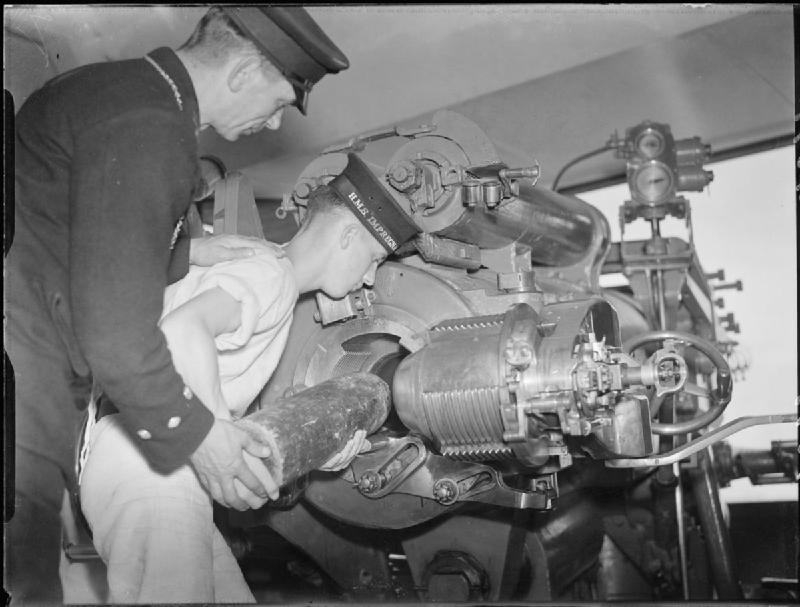
A naval rating recruit loads a six inch gun with help from his instructor at HMS IMPREGNABLE at Devonport, one of the Royal Navy's training extablishments.

For the navy, this meant that it had to accept all men on offer, with the exception of complete illiterates and the feeble-minded. Voluntary entry of ship's boys continued to be a promising source of men as well as youths between the ages of 17 and 18 who were trained in one of the many training centres. Another way to join the navy was through the Y programme, an emergency scheme for training Royal Naval reserve officer volunteers. The mode of entry into the Navy differed depending on the branch selected, with educational requirements playing a significant role. In some instances, entry was granted through competitive examinations, with the selection process limited to candidates pursuing training as skilled artisans. In all branches, a high physical standard was required, particularly for men and boys who were to serve continuously for twenty-two years under service conditions. These conditions entailed serving ashore and afloat in all parts of the world and enduring varying climatic conditions.

The process of recruiting men and boys who met all the necessary criteria was typically carried out in the following manner: Officers not holding the rank of Commander in the Royal Navy or Lieutenant Colonel in the Royal Marines were appointed by the Admiralty as recruiting staff officers under the Director of Naval Recruiting. These officers were stationed at nine headquarters recruiting stations in London, Birmingham, Bristol, Derby, Glasgow, Liverpool, Manchester, Newcastle and Southampton. Each was responsible for a specific geographical area. Additionally, prospective Royal Marines could submit their applications at the Royal Marine Barracks.

The recruiting staff officers at these headquarters recruiting stations were assisted by a staff of 'recruiters' (pensioned N.C.Os., Royal Marines, chief petty officers and petty officers, Royal Navy), who were selected for this duty and appointed by Admiralty Order. The aforementioned recruiters were distributed throughout each area between the headquarters stations in a total of 37 outstations or sub-offices situated in locations remote from the headquarters station.The majority of individuals who were eligible for appointment as officers entered the Royal Naval College at Dartmouth at the age of thirteen or fourteen. They were nearly all from the same background as in terms of family wealth and social position. They had started in preparatory school and subsequently attended a naval institution specialising in passing the examinations required for admission to Dartmouth and other military colleges.

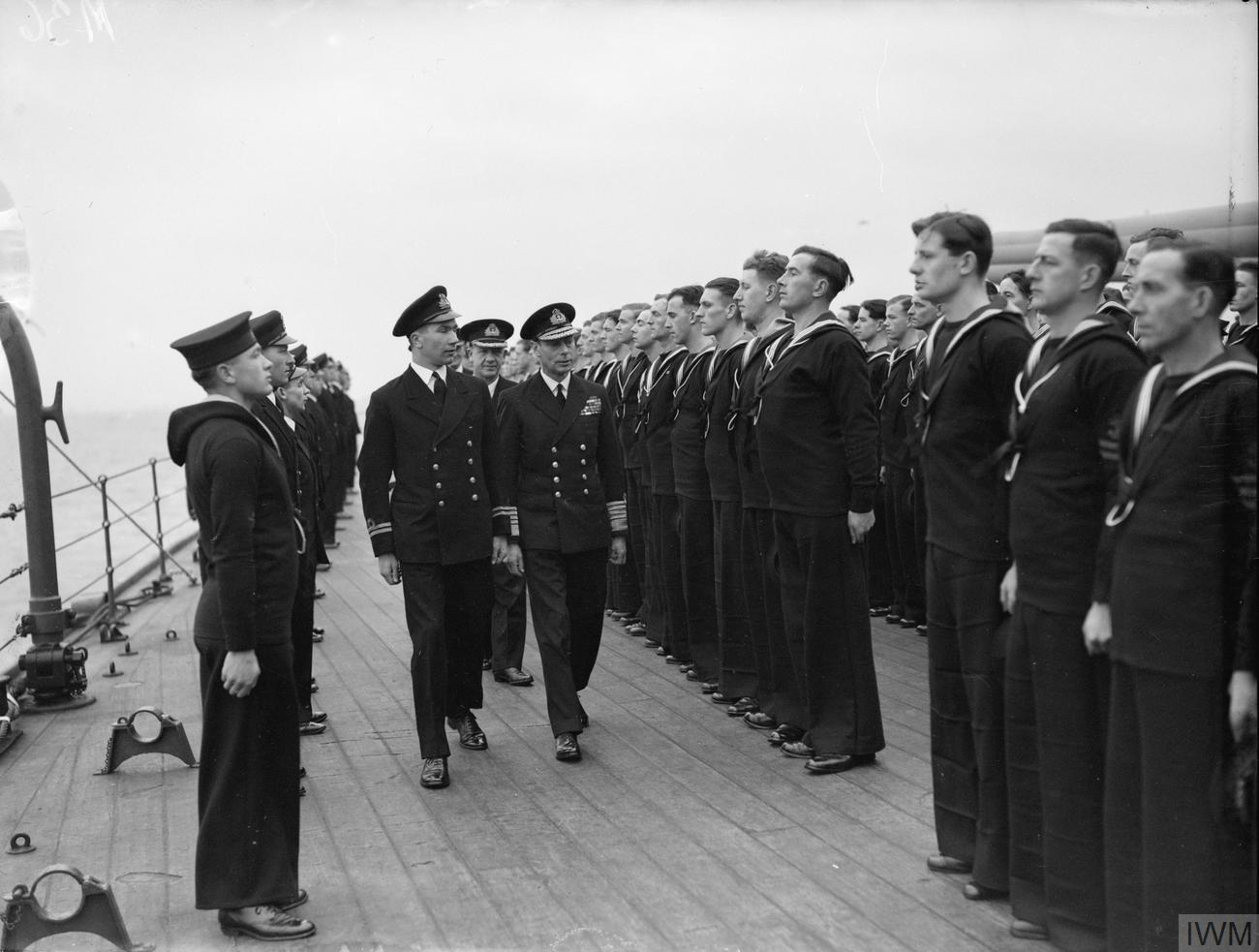
King George VI visiting the Home Fleet based at Scapa Flow, March 1943

In order to gain acceptance, the cadets were required to obtain nominations from individuals in positions of authority. They were subjected to a rigorous selection process, which involved both examinations and interviews. Consequently, only a small proportion of those who applied were ultimately successful. Those with a naval background were particularly favoured, reflecting the continued importance of the Royal Navy as a family-run institution. Once at Dartmouth, the boys received a general education with a more technical focus than that typically provided by public schools. This was combined with a certain amount of naval training, which increased in later years. The only alternative pathway for entry as an officer candidate in peacetime was the Special Entry scheme, initiated by Churchill in 1913. This was partly a means of accelerating the expansion of the officer corps in the period preceding the outbreak of war.

The selected public school boys were taken on at the age of approximately eighteen to undergo training for eighteen months, rather than the six or seven years that would otherwise be required before being commissioned. The Special Entry boys were afforded the opportunity to make a crucial career decision at a more mature age, and they were able to benefit from a broader general education. Furthermore, they were not exposed to cynicism before they went to sea. However, the Special Entry scheme proved inadequate for the significant wartime expansion required by the navy. Primarily, the scheme recruited officers for a permanent career, and the navy was resolved not to repeat the misstep of the previous war, when it raised expectations excessively, only to have them dashed when hundreds of officers were made redundant in the Geddes Axe of 1922.

In order to circumvent the issues that had arisen previously, it was decided that the intake through Dartmouth and the Special Entry scheme would not exceed the peacetime level. Secondly, the Special Entry scheme was designed with the intention of recruiting from public schools. This resulted in a significant limitation in the number of candidates, with the age range being confined to a narrow band of 17 to 19 years. Moreover, it was not an optimal fit for a 'people's war'. In his capacity as First Lord of the Admiralty and subsequently as Prime Minister, Winston Churchill was adamant that the commissioned ranks should be opened up to a more diverse social range.

=== Pay and promotion ===
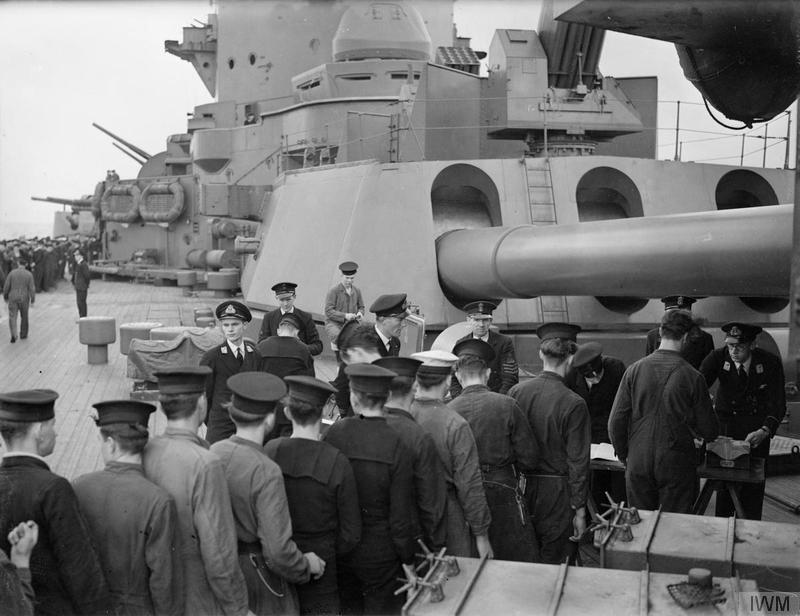
Payday on Nelson in 1941

Pay was not only based on length of service, but also on when entry into the navy took place and whether a person was single or married. For staff officers, this meant a difference of 2 shillings per day if they were married or not. For ratings, the difference was 1 shilling, depending on whether they had joined the Navy before or after 4 October 1925. In addition, an increase in pay every three years was dependent on certain tests and courses. Promotion policy was another complicated issue; in the 1930s the government had raised the average age for promotion to chief seaman from twenty-four to over twenty-seven and to petty officer from twenty-eight to thirty-two. As a result, many able non-commissioned officers had to wait up to ten years to obtain their commission. It was only with the beginning of the war and the increased need for officers that this practice changed.

In 1939, the Navy reached a decision parallel to that of the British Army three years prior, namely that in any future conflict, its temporary officers would be selected from those currently serving in its ranks. Candidates were to be selected at training schools and grouped in a specialist class there. Following this, they should serve at sea for a minimum of three months as ordinary seamen before being selected to attend an officers' training course at HMS King Alfred in Hove. This programme was designated the CW Scheme, deriving its name from the commission and warrant branch of the Admiralty that issued the form by which candidates were assessed. Although ostensibly a 'democratic' system, an initial examination reveals a significant class bias. Primarily, the navy had no intention of promoting a substantial number of regular seamen from the lower deck. Furthermore, naval officers held the view that men who had joined the navy as adolescents, having recently completed their elementary education, would be unsuitable for appointment as naval officers. Indeed an Admiralty Fleet Order of 1940 made it clear that long-service seamen were not to have their hopes.

It is necessary to man the large additions made to the Fleet in war by personnel serving for the period of hostilities only; many of the officers must accordingly be on a temporary basis. While Their Lordships' policy is to obtain a high proportion of such officers by promotion from the Lower Deck ... the grant of such commissions on these lines to continuous service ratings would normally result in their having to leave the service at the termination of hostilities instead of continuing the career in the Navy on which they have embarked... The standard to be achieved for selection for promotion to permanent commissioned rank must remain one which will allow those selected to compete on equal terms with the Officer entered as a cadet. The training given to such selected ratings is thus designed to qualify them to undertake any of the duties of their future rank as required by the exigencies of the service, and to enable them to achieve a complete mastery of their profession. The period of such training must therefore be considerably longer than that for the temporary R.N.V.R. Officer who is only expected to carry out the limited duties of one special type of appointment for the duration of the war.

Flag officer
Pay	Daily
Admiral of the fleet	£7/4/10
Admiral	£6/6/8
Vice admiral	£5/8/8
Rear admiral	£4/10/6

Senior officer
pay (Note: The first column shows the rates of pay for officers who joined before 1 April 1938 but have not since been promoted and who are not covered by the marriage allowance scheme. The second column contains the rates for such officers within the marriage allowance and for all officers who joined, re-joined or were promoted on or after 1 April 1938 (regardless of whether they are married officers or not).)	Upon entering service		After 3 Years		After 6 Years		After 9 Years	
Captain	£2/14/4	£2/12/4	£2/18/10	£2/16/10	£3/3/4	£3/1/4	£3/7/10	£3/5/10
Commander	£1/16/2	£1/14/2	£1/19/10	£1/17/10	£2/3/6	£2/1/6	£2/7/–	£2/5/–
Lieutenant Commander	£1/7/2	£1/5/2	£1/9/–	£1/7/–	£1/10/10	£1/8/10	£1/12/10	£1/10/10
Lieutenant	16/6		17/6		19/–			
Sub-Lieutenant	13/–							
Midshipman	6/10							

Non-commissioned officers and ratings
pay (Note: The left-hand column refers to entry into the Royal Navy before 5 October 1925, the right-hand column to entry after 4 October 1925.)	Upon entering service		After 3 Years		After 6 Years		After 9 Years	
Chief Petty Officer	8/6	7/6	9/–	8/–	9/6	8/6	10/–	9/–
Petty Officer	7/–	6/–	7/4	6/5	7/8	6/10		
Leading Seaman	5/3	4/4	5/6	4/8				
Able Seaman	4/–	3/–	4/3	3/4	4/6	3/8		
Ordinary Seaman	2/9	2/–						

Women's Royal Naval Service Officers
Annual Pay Land|Sea	Upon entering service		After 3 Years	
Superintendent	£500	£400	£550	£445
Chief Officer	£350	£260	£390	£295
First Officer	£225	£180	£250	£202
Second Officer	£180	£140	£200	£157
Third Officer	£160	£120	£175	£132

== Branches ==
=== Fleet air arm ===
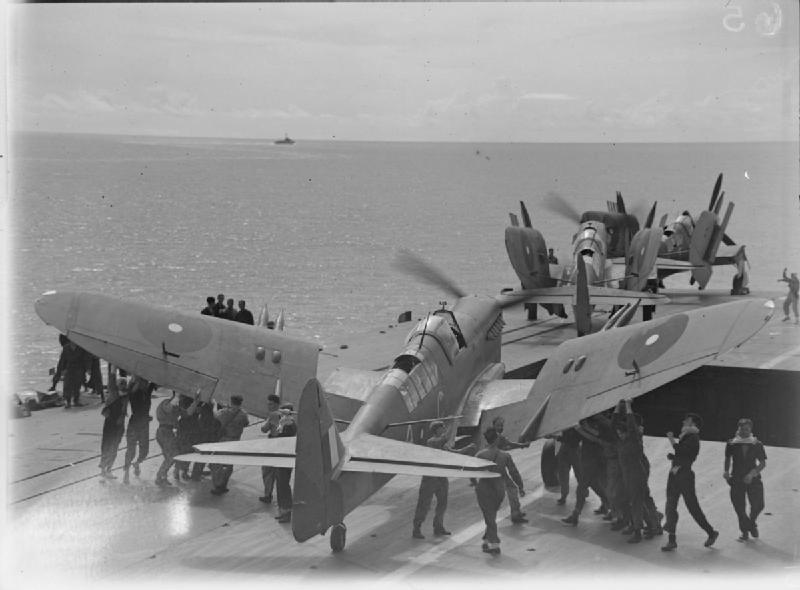
Men folding the wings of a Fairey Firefly of 1770 Squadron, Fleet Air Arm on board HMS INDEFATIGABLE on the aircraft's return from the carrier-borne air strike on the Japanese oil refinery at Pangkalan Brandan, Sumatra

By the time war broke out on 3 September 1939 the Royal Navy had in full commission the carriers Ark Royal, Eagle, Furious, Glorious and Hermes, as well as Argus and Courageous in use as training carriers; in addition, nearly 50 capital ships had by then been equipped with catapults. Added to this there were 232 operational aircraft 4 Naval air stations, and something over 700 pilots, observers and telegraphist-air-gunners. By the end of the war the strength of the Fleet Air Arm was 59 aircraft carriers, 3,700 aircraft, 72,000 officers and men and 56 Naval air stations.

Command of the Fleet Air Arm was the responsibility of the Fifth Sea Lord, who was a member of the Board of Admiralty. This role was only established in 1938 as the Chief of Naval Air Services, with responsibility for the preparation and management of all aircraft and air personnel belonging to the Royal Navy. The Fifth Sea Lord was aided in his quotidian responsibilities by Rear Admiral Naval Air Stations, based in Lee-on-Solent. He was tasked with orchestrating and coordinating the activities of the Fleet Air Arm's maritime bases, ensuring the appointment of FAA officers and advancement of ratings, in conjunction with the RAF authorities.The basic unit was the squadron, which typically comprised 12 aircraft. By Admiralty Fleet orders 1939 a senior Executive RM(A) or an RAF officer was in command of a unit to which he was appointed and therefore responsible for its general efficiency and the conduct of its operations. The squadron commanding officer (CO) was typically a lieutenant commander. With the expansion of squadrons during the war, senior lieutenants were also appointed to lead a squadron. The Navy's divisional system was also employed within the Fleet Air Arm. This entailed the grouping of ratings into divisions, with each division being the responsibility of a divisional officer (DO), assisted by a divisional senior rating. Pilots and observers were designated as divisional officers for mechanics, while the senior observer typically assumed the role of divisional officer for the telegraphist and air gunners.

Depending on which employment the men were fit for, they either were sent to the Royal Naval Barracks, Lee-on-Solent for pilots or to H.M.S. Royal Arthur a shore establishment signalmen, telegraphists, coders and wireless operators. After a month's initial training all aspirants were send to H.M.S. St. Vincent, another shore establishment. After another two months' training pilots and ground staff were then send to an RAF station for elementary flying training, to H.M.S. Excellent for gunnery course, or to a naval air gunnery school. Due to a scheme stipulated between the US and Great Britain a number of British naval pilots received their complete flying training in the United States at the great naval air stations of Gross Isle, Pensacola and Miami. At the end of a further period of training the men passed out as a qualified pilot and returned to England as a Midshipman (A) R.N.V.R. The completion of the training followed at the Naval Air Fighter School at H.M.S. Heron in Somerset.

=== Women's Royal Naval Service ===
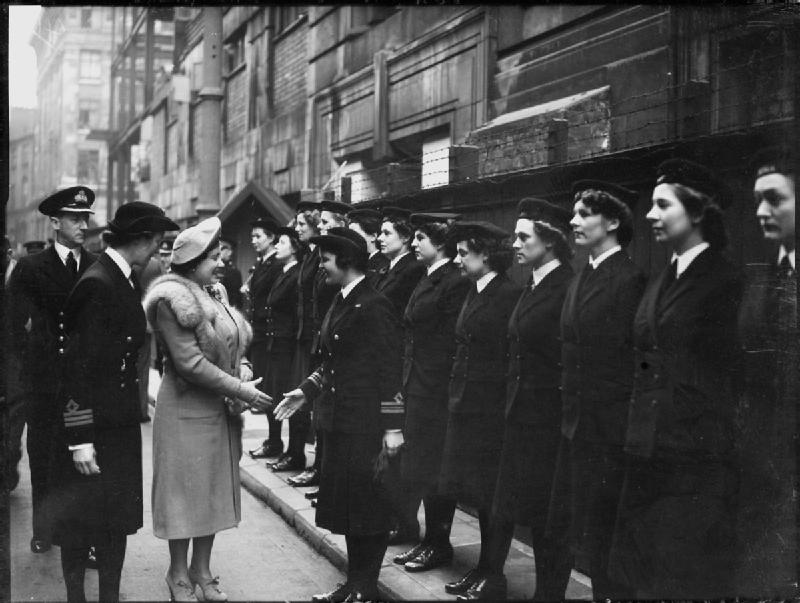
Queen Elizabeth inspecting a detachment of Wrens in Liverpool, c. 1943

Already founded in 1917 the Women's Royal Naval Service (WRNS) was disbanded in 1919. However, thanks to Dame Katharine Furse', the former head of the WRNS campaign, the Women's Royal Naval Service (WRNS) was reactivated in 1938. The basic training for WRNS recruits usually lasted about 4 to 6 weeks. Specialised training lasted an additional 4 to 12 weeks, depending on the task. Recruits were introduced to naval customs, discipline, ranks, and the structure of the Royal Navy. Training included learning about basic naval duties, such as signalling, clerical work, and other administrative tasks. Recruits were also taught how to handle confidential documents and communications. While the physical fitness component was not as rigorous as that of male recruits, physical exercise was included to ensure that the women could meet the demands of their roles. This generally included drills, marching, and basic physical training. After completing the initial training, WRNS members were often sent to specialised courses depending on their assigned roles. The duration of these courses varied depending on the complexity of the job.

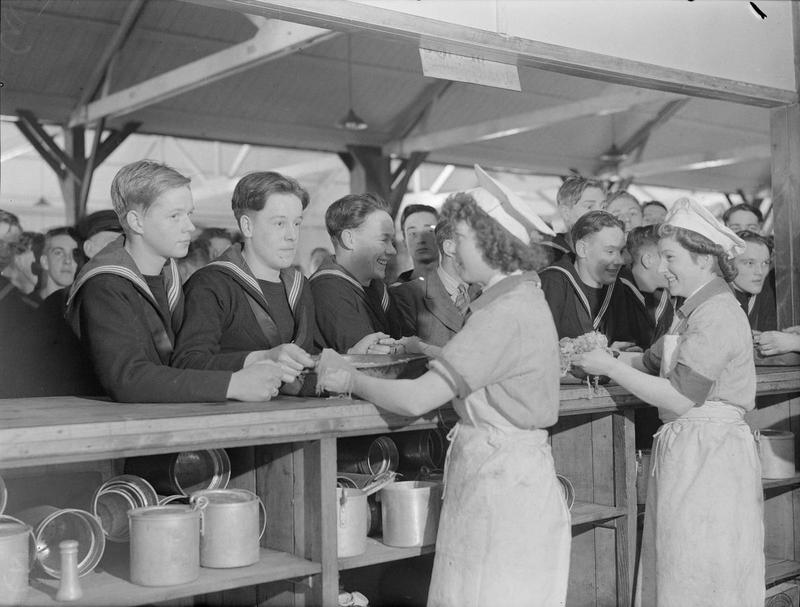
WRNS cooks serving new recruits aboard Raleigh, January 1943

Originally the WRNS was recruited under civilian contracts and it was not considered necessary to bring them under the Naval Discipline Act. They came under the Civil Establishment Branch which tended to regard them as civilians until 1941 when the administration of the WRNS transferred to the Commission and Warrant Branch for officers and to the Naval Branch for ratings. At first there were only seven places where women could join the WRNS: Portsmouth, Plymouth, Chatham, London, Liverpool, Manchester and Rosyth. Later recruiting centres were set up in Aberdeen, Belfast, Birmingham, Cardiff, Glasgow, Leeds and Newcastle. By early 1942 nearly 7,000 women were in traditional roles as stewardesses and cooks, and 5,000 more were clerical workers. Additional 3,800 worked in naval communications, as Recruiting Assistant, Night Vision Tester, Cinema Operator and Exercise Corrector. There were also Aircraft Checkers and Fitters, Radio Mechanics, Range Wardens and Machinists, which were all unthinkable for women before the war.

=== Medical Service ===
The Medical Department of the Royal Navy then was responsible for the administration of the Naval Medical Services, in which are included all ancillary services such as the Royal Naval Dental Service, Queen Alexandra's Royal Naval Nursing Service, the Sick Berth Branch of the Navy, and the Voluntary Aid Detachment allotted to the Navy.

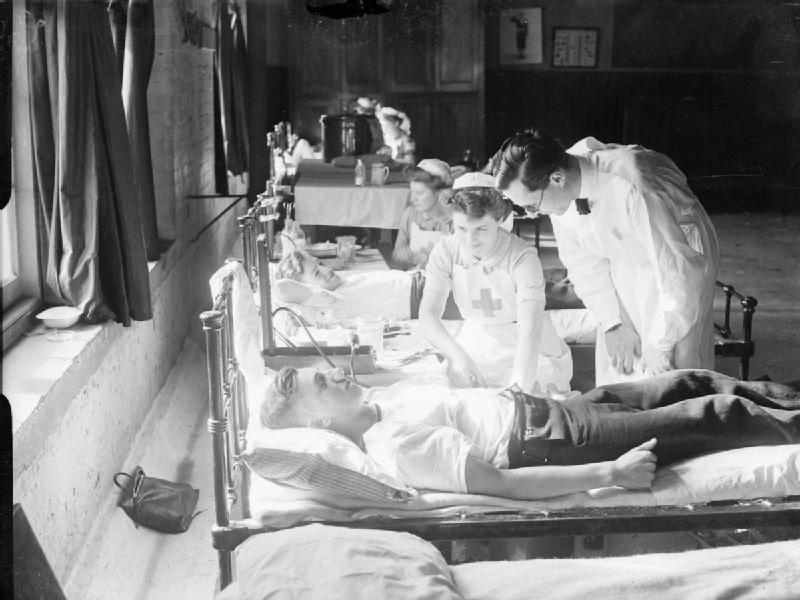
The doctor inspecting a blood donor at HMS ST VINCENT, the training establishment at Gosport in which pilots and observers of the Fleet Air Arm spend their first few weeks.

==== Sick Berth Branch ====
In peace-time sick berth ratings were recruited on a voluntary basis, and signed for a period of 12 years with an opportunity to re-engage for a further period to complete time for pension. On entry, newly joined probationer sick berth attendants were absorbed into either the Portsmouth, Chatham or Devonport Port Division. After a disciplinary course of six weeks, probationers were transferred to a naval hospital for a course of professional training which lasted for approximately nine months. At the end of this training period, those who passed a qualifying examination were rated as sick berth attendants, suitable to be appointed for service anywhere ashore or afloat. It was customary, however, for the newly qualified man to be retained for a further period of months as a member of the staff of his training hospital, thus permitting him to acquire further experience and a sense of responsibility. In the Royal Naval Medical Service, career advancement could be achieved through progression to roles such as leading sick berth attendant, sick berth petty officer, and sick berth chief petty officer.

This advancement depended on an individual's character, service record, and the ability to pass professional examinations. These exams covered a range of subjects, including anatomy, physiology, signs of diseases, general nursing, first aid, dispensing, cooking for the sick, and knowledge of surgical instruments and administration. A high standard was demanded, particularly for those advancing to petty officer and chief petty officer ranks. Outstanding sick berth chief petty officers had the opportunity to be promoted to warrant rank, joining the wardmaster officers branch of the Navy. However, this opportunity was rare, with only about 2% of the sick berth staff likely to achieve this. Promotion to the wardmaster branch was selective, requiring a consistently exceptional service record, possession of a higher educational certificate, and passing a comprehensive examination. Further advancement within the wardmaster officers branch was possible, with roles such as commissioned wardmaster, wardmaster lieutenant, and occasionally wardmaster lieutenant commander available.

Such promotions were influenced by the officer's age and the availability of vacancies in this specialised branch. Throughout their careers, members of the sick berth staff could specialise in professional subjects such as physiotherapy, radiography, laboratory techniques, and operating room assistance. Specialists were granted extra pay and privileges, with approximately 18% of staff obtaining these qualifications in peacetime. At the outbreak of war, the sick berth staff consisted of 2 wardmaster lieutenants, 4 commissioned wardmasters, 16 warrant wardmasters, 125 sick berth chief petty officers, 268 sick berth petty officers, 301 leading sick berth attendants and 471 sick berth attendants, making a total of 1,187. By 1943 the numbers had risen to 5 wardmaster lieutenant commanders, 14 wardmaster lieutenants, 4 commissioned wardmasters, 17 warrant wardmasters, 73 temporary warrant wardmasters, 540 sick berth chief petty officers, 1,057 sick berth petty officers, 1,488 leading sick berth attendants, 3,949 sick berth attendants, 60 dental sick berth petty officers, 95 dental leading sick berth attendants, 239 dental sick berth attendants, and 200 miscellaneous specialist ratings entered for 'hostilities only', making a total of 7,541 altogether. By the end of the war the number of wardmaster officers employed was 138, and the sick berth branch had reached a total complement of approximately 12,000.

During wartime, compulsory entry under the National Service Act was necessary to meet the demands for medical personnel. Although men with some medical background were preferred, all new recruits were treated as untrained and underwent a full training course. The aim was to quickly convert civilians into skilled medical personnel suited for naval duties. Training was intensive, focusing on practical medical skills and naval routines, while minimising academic instruction. Initially, courses lasted ten weeks, later extended to twenty weeks, but eventually reverted to ten weeks due to operational needs. Training included medical duties, naval routines, chemical warfare, fire fighting, and preparation for landing operations. Some trainees also received specialised training for tropical service. The courses were physically and mentally demanding, revealing some older trainees were unfit for active service. Training took place at Royal Naval Hospitals, led by experienced medical staff, but varied depending on local conditions. A major challenge was providing suitable accommodation for staff and trainees.

==== Nursing Service ====
On September 3, 1939, 127 nursing sisters were available for immediate duty at home, and naturally this number had to be further augmented during the remainder of 1939 in order to provide staff for auxiliary hospitals at Barrow Gurney, Kingseat, Aberdeen, Idsworth, Invergordon, Newton Abbot, as well as the Naval Wing of the 64th General Hospital, Alexandria. In addition staff were provided for R.N. Hospital, Portland, R.N. Sick Quarters in Grimsby and at Douglas, Isle of Man, and for Hospital Ships Oxfordshire, Aba and Amarapoora. In 1940, a further 115 nursing sisters were entered, and during the remainder of the war, constant expansion necessitated the stafing of 269 medical establishments at home and abroad. To meet requirements 110 nursing sisters were entered in 1941, 229 in 1942, 288 in 1943, 290 in 1944, 76 in 1945, reaching a peak of 1,129 actually borne in April 1945, and a grand total of 1,341 during the whole war period. By the end of the war, naval nursing sisters had seen service all over the world, including Ceylon, Egypt, Singapore, India, North and South Africa, Hong Kong, and later Normandy and Germany.

Nursing in a naval hospital in war-time was a very different occupation for a sister from nursing in peace-time. In peace-time, the nursing staff of the average ward had not number more than five sick berth ratings under the guidance of one sister. More often than not the number was four. In war-time the majority of the subordinate staff of sick berth ratings and V.A.Ds. were largely untrained, and extra sisters were necessary to supervise nursing as well as to give constant practical instruction. As the war progressed, the necessary ratio of nursing sisters was found to be one to each 20 beds, making an average of two sisters in each ward. In acute wards receiving casualties, it was found that three sisters were not too many, though not always possible.

The sister's training function was most vital to the sick berth staff and V.A.Ds. In the case of the sick berth staff, a ward sister was required to devote as much of her spare time as possible to giving practical nursing instruction to men whose training time in hospital would be short, and who would soon be required to undertake the sole nursing responsibility of sick and wounded in small ships afloat. In the case of V.A.Ds. a more gradual process of instruction could be effected, for their time in hospital was continuous, and they were unlikely ever to be left to their own responsibilities. With the expert guidance of a capable sister many of these nurses fell quite naturally into nursing duties and became most reliable. In 1943, naval medical commitments became so wide that it was necessary to introduce for V.A.Ds. the same intensive course of training as for the probationary sick berth staff.
