= Typhoon Lan (2023) =

Pacific typhoon in 2023

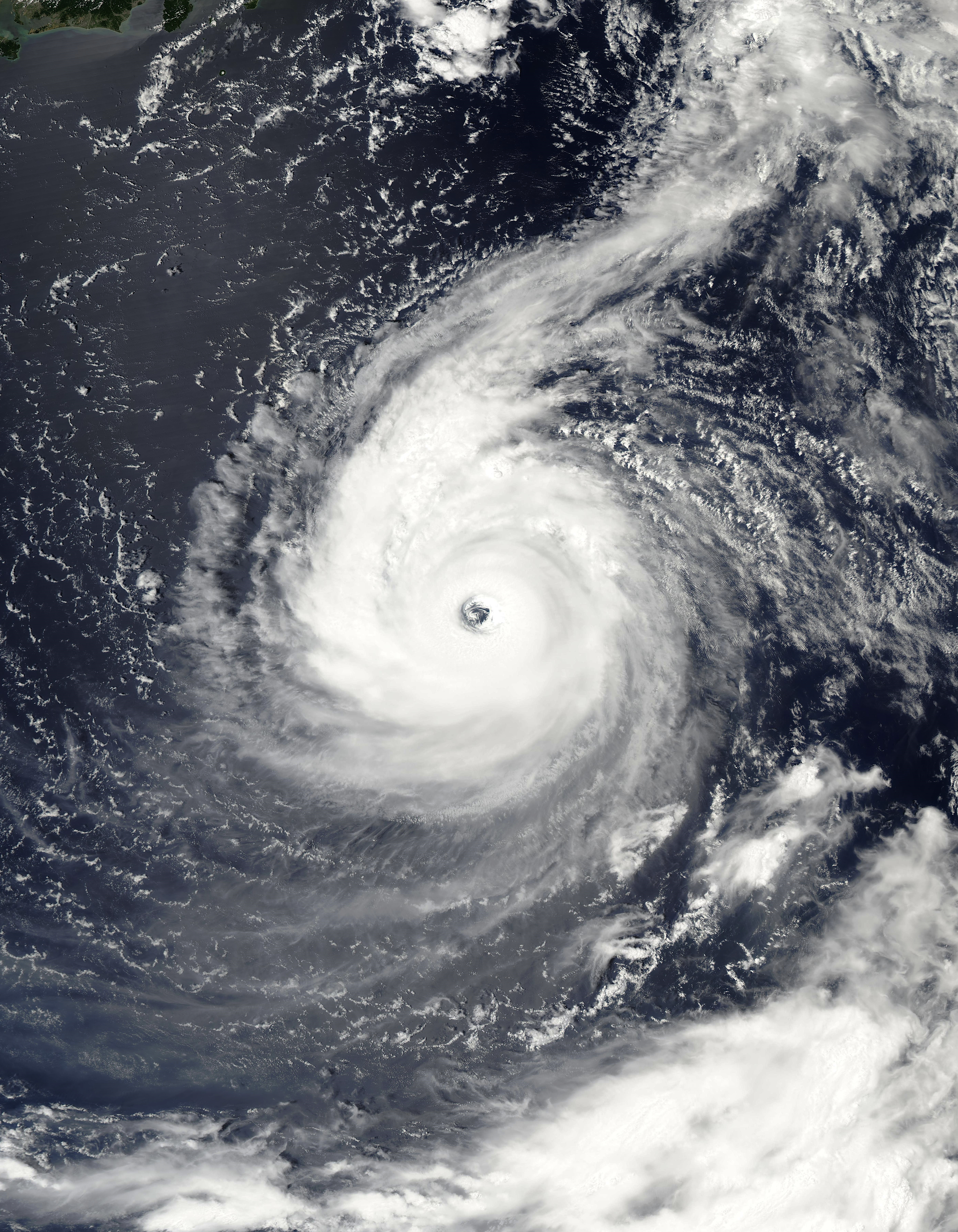
- Typhoon Lan at peak intensity on August 11

Meteorological history
- Formed: August 5, 2023
- Extratropical: August 17, 2023
- Dissipated: August 18, 2023

Very strong typhoon
- 10-minute sustained (JMA)
- Highest winds: 165 km/h (105 mph)
- Lowest pressure: 940 hPa (mbar); 27.76 inHg

Category 4-equivalent typhoon
- 1-minute sustained (SSHWS/JTWC)
- Highest winds: 220 km/h (140 mph)
- Lowest pressure: 932 hPa (mbar); 27.52 inHg

Overall effects
- Fatalities: 1
- Injuries: 64
- Damage: $500 million (2023 USD)
- Areas affected: Bonin Islands, Japan
- IBTrACS
- Part of the 2023 Pacific typhoon season

Typhoon Lan (Note: The name Lan (Marshallese: ļan̄, [lˠɑŋ]) was contributed by the United States and means "storm, typhoon" in Marshallese.) was a powerful tropical cyclone that struck central Japan in mid-August 2023. The seventh named storm and fifth typhoon of the 2023 Pacific typhoon season, Lan originated from an area of low pressure several hundred kilometers east of Iwo Jima. It initially tracked north-northwestward, gradually intensifying into a tropical storm and later to typhoon status, reaching its peak as a Category 4-equivalent typhoon with sustained winds of 215 km/h (130 mph) and a central pressure of 940 hPa (27.76 inHg). Lan then quickly weakened the following day due to the effects of inner ring of cloud tops and well-defined eyewall. Lan re-strengthened again to 155 km/h (100 mph), Lan made landfall near Cape Shionomisaki in Japan. Once inland, Lan rapidly weakened and degenerated into a tropical storm over the region's rough terrain. Lan emerged back over the southern Sea of Japan, before declared it an extratropical low on August 17. The low moved east-northeast and was last noted on the next day.

Lan caused widespread damage. In addition to causing landslides and flooding, the storm also uprooted trees and damaged electrical lines. At least 100,000 homes are without power, and more than 237,000 individuals have been forced from their homes. The Japan Meteorological Agency (JMA) issued purple heavy rain—the second highest level on a four-tier scale—and landslide warnings for parts of Kyoto Prefecture in Kansai region and Iwate Prefecture in Tōhoku region as of late August 14. One person has been reported dead and 64 are reported to have remained injured following the typhoon. Total losses are estimated to be around $500 million (2023 USD) according to AON.

== Meteorological history ==
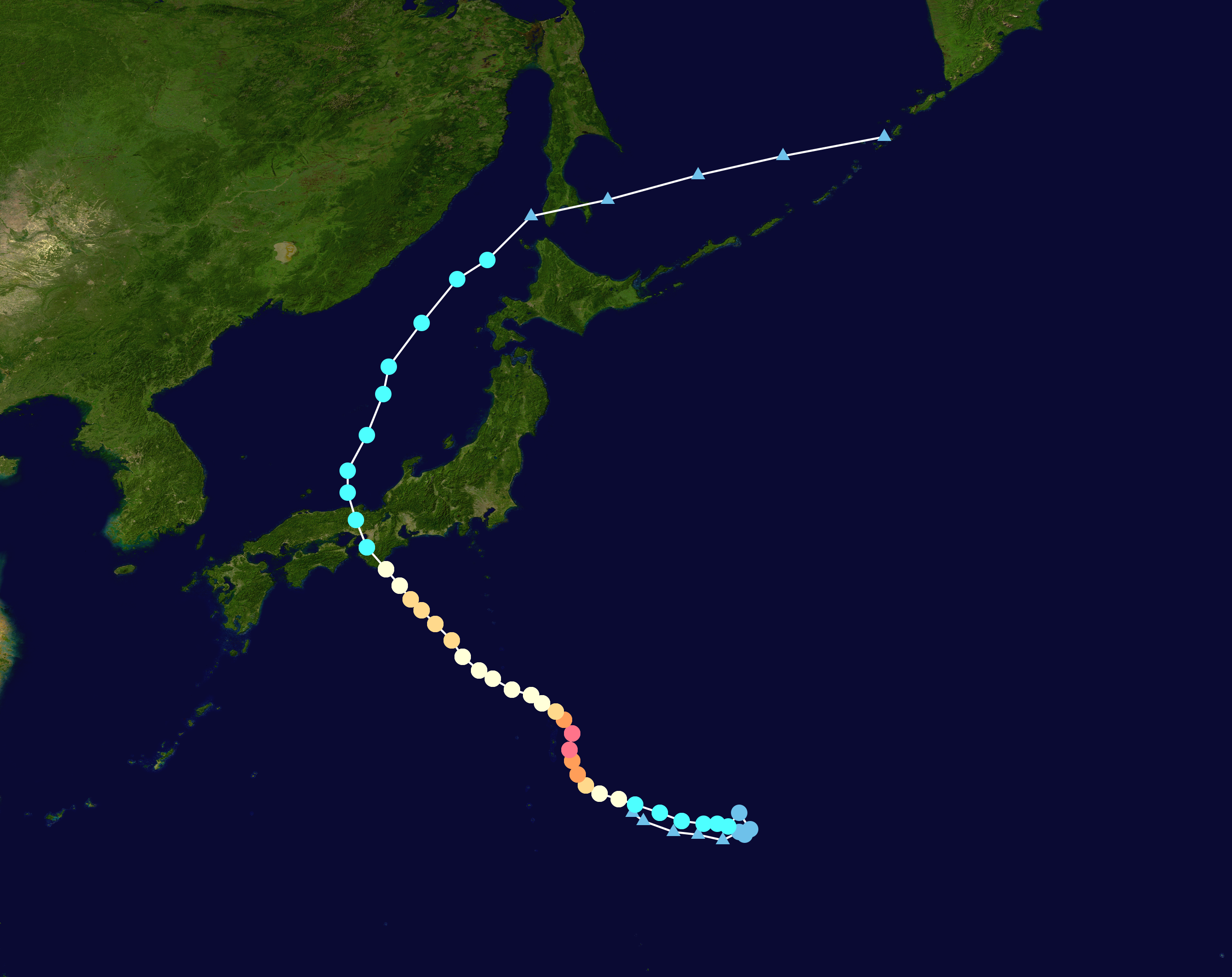
Map plotting the storm's track and intensity, according to the Saffir–Simpson scale Map key Saffir–Simpson scale Tropical depression (≤38 mph, ≤62 km/h) Tropical storm (39–73 mph, 63–118 km/h) Category 1 (74–95 mph, 119–153 km/h) Category 2 (96–110 mph, 154–177 km/h) Category 3 (111–129 mph, 178–208 km/h) Category 4 (130–156 mph, 209–251 km/h) Category 5 (≥157 mph, ≥252 km/h) Unknown Storm type Tropical cyclone Subtropical cyclone Extratropical cyclone, remnant low, tropical disturbance, or monsoon depression

The origins of Typhoon Lan can be traced back to August 5, when the Japan Meteorological Agency (JMA) reported that a low-pressure area had formed east-northeast of Iwo Jima. Deep convection shifted towards the southeastern semicircle of the circulation, while the still-poorly defined center. Environmental conditions were assessed as being marginally conducive for tropical cyclogenesis, with warm sea surface temperatures (SST) near 29–30 °C (84–86 °F) and low vertical wind shear, and good equatorward outflow. At the same time, the JMA upgraded it to a tropical depression, before the Joint Typhoon Warning Center (JTWC) issued a Tropical Cyclone Formation Alert on the system. The agency followed suit and designated the system 07W. The same day, the agency upgraded to a tropical storm, with the JMA assigning the name Lan for the system. Satellite imagery depicting a convective banding feature with some deep convection over the northern and eastern semicircle.

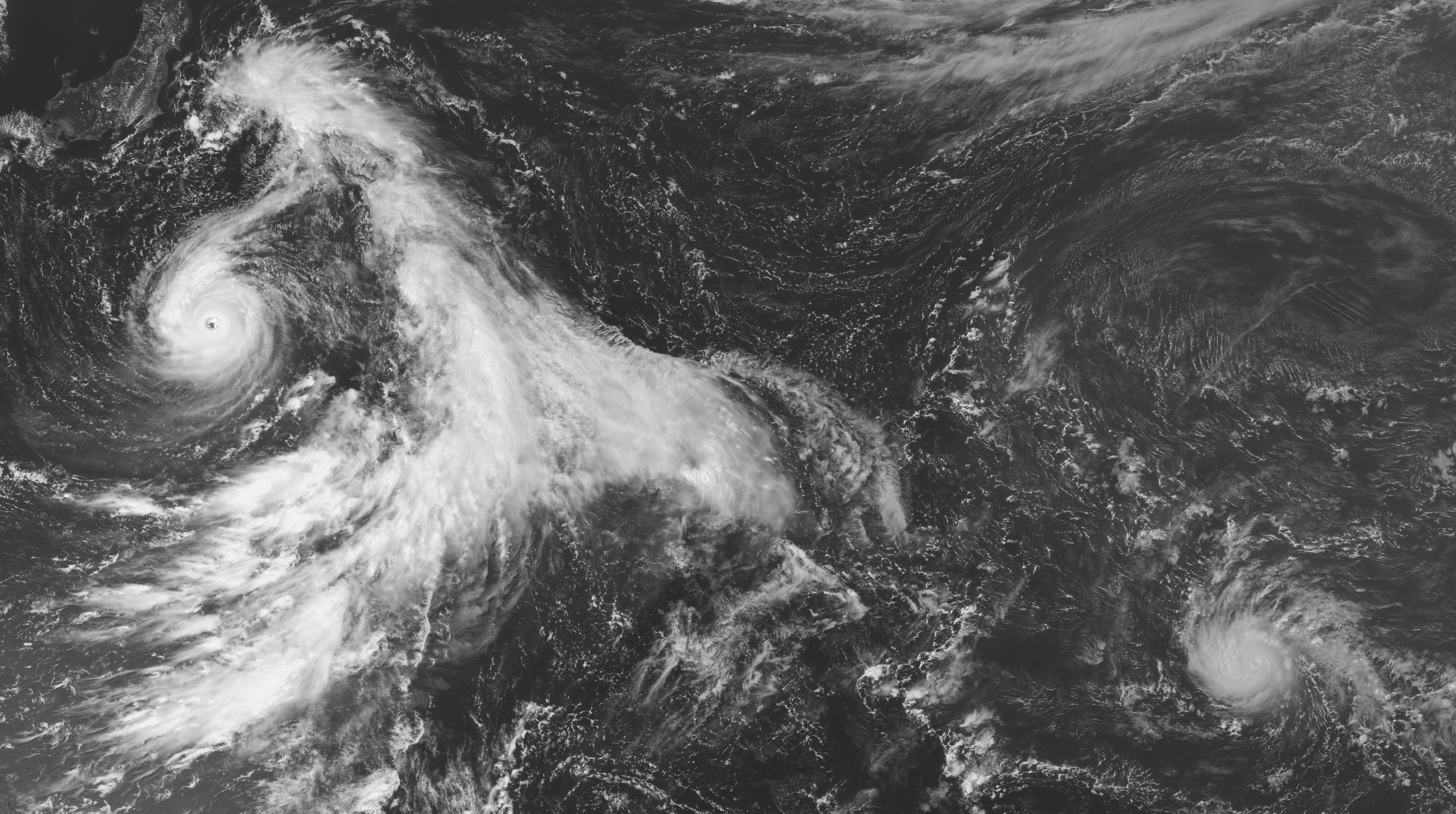
Typhoon Lan (left) and Hurricane Dora (right) on August 11

A banding eye began to appear on satellite imagery; the deep convection had started to consolidate and wrap around the low-level circulation center. Lan continued to strengthen as it turned more westward under the influence of the SST and weak vertical wind shear, the JMA upgraded Lan to a severe tropical storm at 06:00 UTC on August 9 as its maximum sustained winds increased to 95 km/h (60 mph). Organization began to steadily increase within the developing eyewall, but the JTWC reported that it did not intensify over the past twelve hours. Lan began to intensify more quickly, reaching typhoon status. Lan consolidated and developed a small, defined circulation with satellite imagery revealed a 30 nautical miles (56 km; 35 mi) ragged eye. Lan developed a clear eye and continued strengthening on satellite imagery, surrounded by a warming eye of 10–17 °C (50–63 °F).

The JTWC upgraded it to Category 4-equivalent typhoon on August 11 after Dvorak estimates indicated winds of 215 km/h (130 mph). The JMA also assessed Lan to have winds of 165 km/h (105 mph), and a minimum pressure of 940 hPa (27.76 inHg). The typhoon sustained a symmetric ring around deep convection. Shortly after that however, Lan's slow motion began to upwell colder waters below the storm and the typhoon began to weaken. Further degradation continued through August 12 with the cloud tops warming and the eyewall detoriating. Lan re-strengthened again to 155 km/h (100 mph) as it strengthened. The storm maintained its overall convective structure, but the waters beneath the cyclone cooled, prompting a quick weakening trend. The JMA downgraded Lan to a severe tropical storm, with estimated winds of 110 km/h (70 mph). Around 19:00 UTC on August 14, Lan made landfall near Cape Shionomisaki in Japan. Once inland, Lan rapidly weakened and degenerated into a tropical storm over the region's rough terrain. Lan emerged back over the southern Sea of Japan. as it had an exposed low-level circulation center with banding structure. Lan began to accelerate to the northeast while weakening, the JTWC discontinued warnings on the system. The JMA issued its last advisory on Lan, and declared it an extratropical low on August 17. Lan tracked east-northeast until it was last noted on the next day.

== Effects in Japan ==
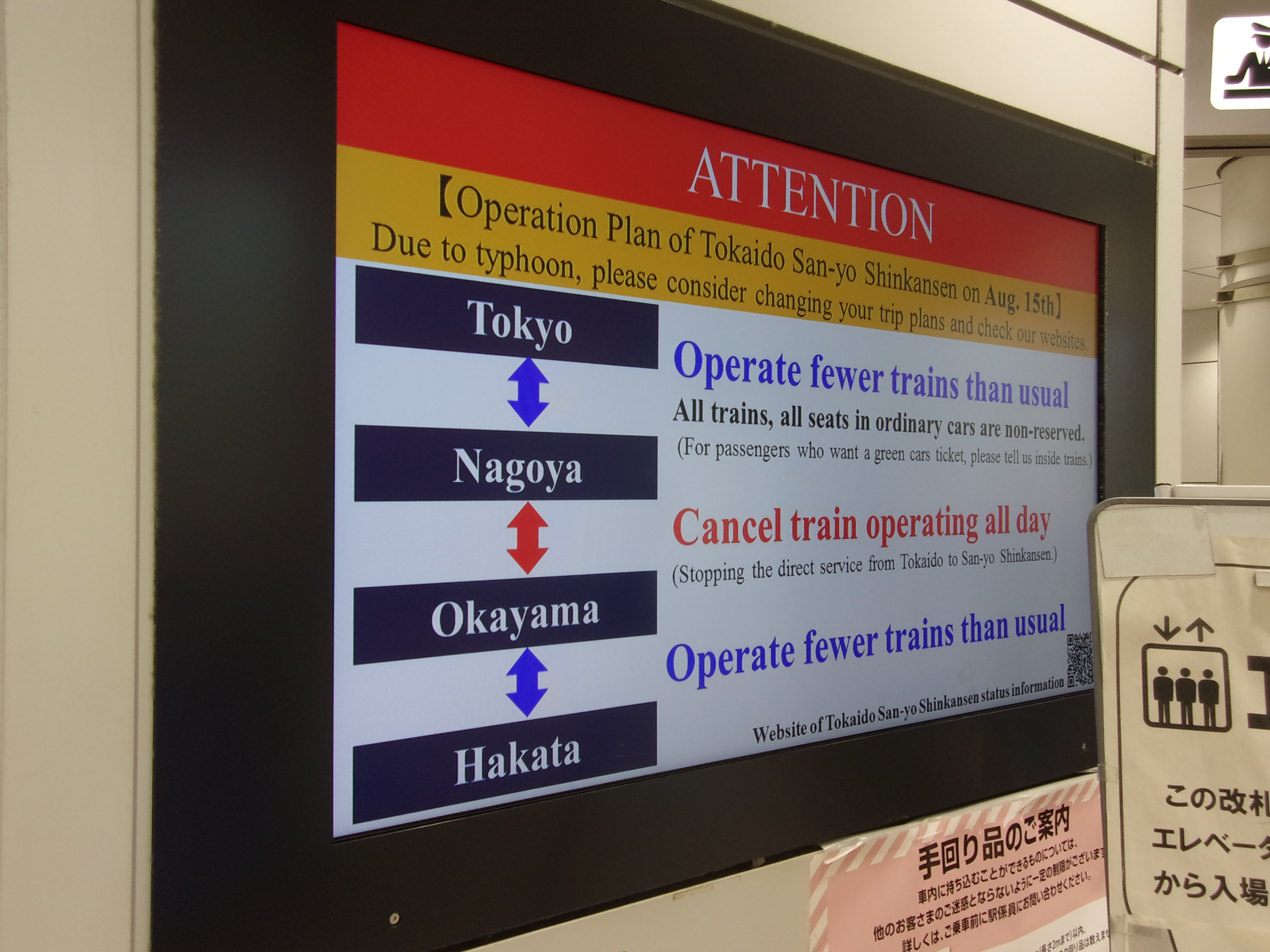
Schedule of the Tohoku-Hokkaido Shinkansen which was suspended due to the typhoon.

Authorities in Japan issued a strong typhoon warning for much of the country. The JMA issued purple heavy rain—the second highest level on a four-tier scale—and landslide warnings for parts of Kyoto Prefecture in Kansai region and Iwate Prefecture in Tōhoku region as of late August 14, as well as purple storm surge warnings for parts of Hyōgo and Wakayama prefectures in Kansai region. Tokai region was anticipated to receive up to 45 mm (1.8 in) of precipitation, while the Kansai and Shikoku was expected to receive up to 40 mm (1.6 in). Hundreds of thousands of people have been ordered to evacuate in Aichi, Kyoto, Mie, Nara, and Wakayama prefecture. In preparation for the storm, authorities are releasing water from dams across the Chūgoku, Kansai, and Tokai regions. Red high wave warnings have been issued for the Izu Islands by the JMA. Throughout Shikoku, Hiroshima, and Shimane prefectures to Nagano and Niigata prefectures, rain of 1–4 in (25–102 mm) is anticipated. Prefectures from Tottori to Fukui may experience amounts of 4–8 in (100–200 mm). A level 3 evacuation was ordered for 26,000 senior residents of a town in Wakayama Prefecture on Tuesday morning due to concerns that heavy rains will cause landslides.

Typhoon Lan passing over the Ogasawara Islands on August 14

Typhoon Lan caused widespread damage. In addition to causing landslides and flooding, the typhoon also uprooted trees and damaged electrical lines. More than 100,000 homes are without power, and more than 237,000 individuals have been forced from their homes. The Japanese government has dispatched rescue teams to assist with the cleanup. The government has dispatched food and water to the affected districts, and the military has been deployed to assist with rescue and relief efforts. According to officials, more than 590 residences in Tottori City are now cut off as access roads have been damaged.

The western prefecture of Wakayama has experienced strong gusts and torrential rainfall. At least 50,000 households in western and central Japan lost electricity. More than 800 flights were cancelled. An amount of rain similar to three times the usual August rainfall was recorded in Tottori Prefecture in a single day, totaling 470 mm (19 in) in 24 hours. In Okayama and Tottori prefectures, 500 mm (20 in) of rain dropped during a period of 24 hours, while 100 mm (3.9 in) of rain fell every hour in Kyoto, Nara, and Tottori prefectures. Economic losses from the storm totaled $500 million according to AON.

Representatives from several of Japanese prefectures announced that they would postpone commemorating the surrender of Japan in World War II. The Japanese High School Baseball Championship held in Hyōgo Prefecture was postponed in August 16. An 80-year-old female who was stuck in Saji Town was taken to the hospital for emergency care due to cardiac arrest, but she perished, another 64 remain injured. According to the Japan Airlines, 240 domestic flights have been canceled as a result of Typhoon Lan. Lan prompted the closure of Ghibli Park, Universal Studios Japan, and Nintendo. Retailers and logistics firms would cease operations in western and center regions in Japan.

== See also ==
- Weather of 2023
- Tropical cyclones in 2023
- Typhoon Ida (1958)
- Typhoon Vera (1959)
- Typhoon Jebi (2018)
