= Cape Shionomisaki =

Headland in the Kansai Region of Japan

Coordinates: 33°26′15″N 135°45′16″E

Cape Shionomisaki 潮岬 (Shiono-misaki)
- Cape
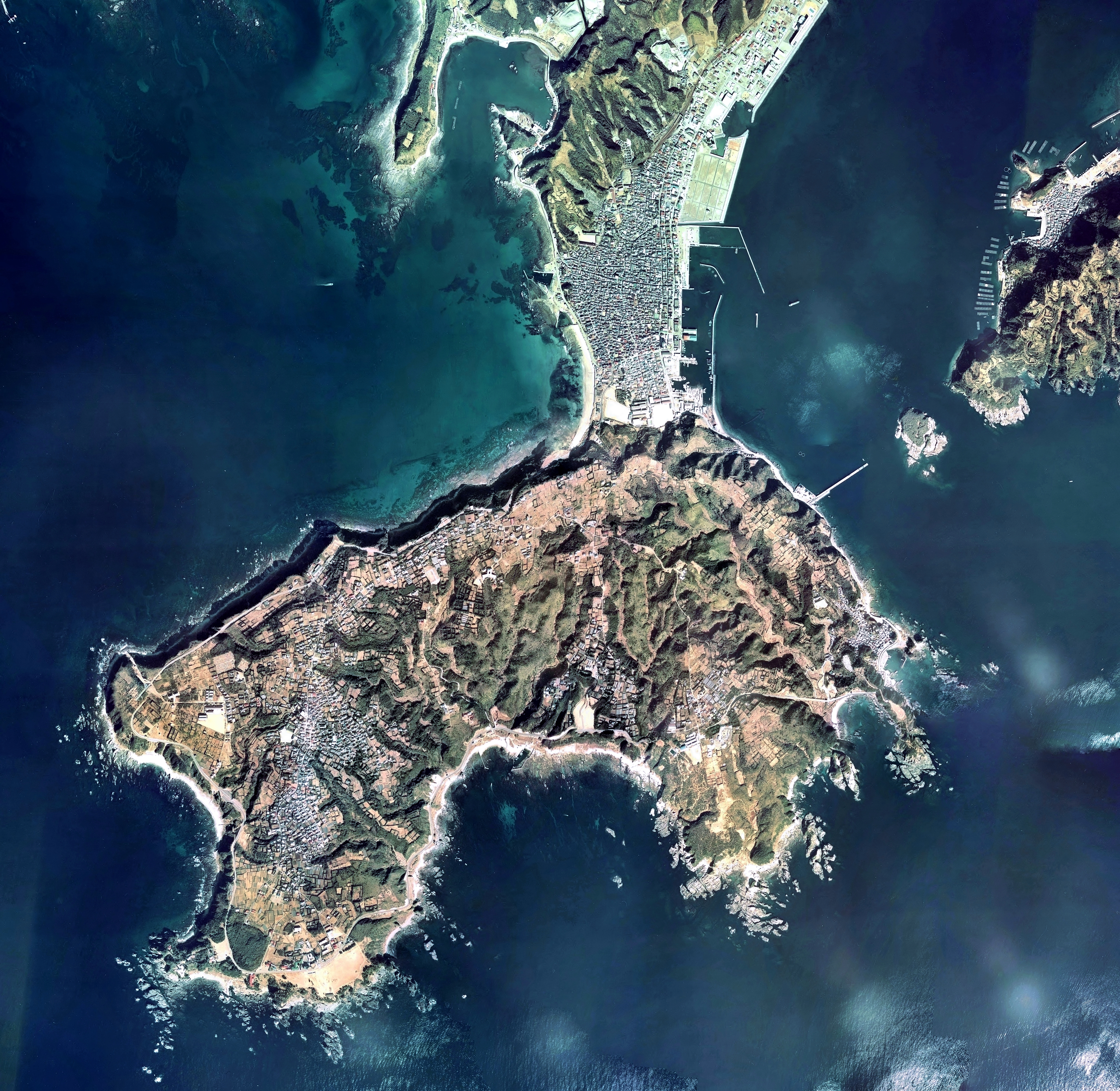
- Cape Shionomisaki aerial photograph

- Location within Wakayama Prefecture Location within Japan
- Coordinates
- Location: Kushimoto, Wakayama, Japan
- Water bodies: Pacific Ocean

Cape Shionomisaki (潮岬, Shiono-misaki) is a headland located in southern Kii Peninsula in the Kansai Region of Japan. It is located within the borders of the town of Kushimoto in Wakayama Prefecture, and is the most southerly point of the island of Honshu, and Wakayama Prefecture. Much of the cape is also a part of the Yoshino-Kumano National Park. The area is subject to frequent typhoons and the cape is often used as an indicator of the location of typhoons relative to Japan.

Geologically, the cape is a flat uplifted seabed plateau with an elevation of 60 to 80 meters consisting of two marine terraces, and a coastal cliff with a height of 40 meters. Originally an island, gravel from the estuary of nearby rivers is carried by coastal currents to form a sandbar, which now connects the island to land.

Cape Shionomisaki is the location of the Shionomisaki Lighthouse, one of the “50 Lighthouses of Japan” by the Japan Lighthouse Association.

== Climate ==
Climate data for Cape Shionomisaki, Kushimoto (elevation 68 m (223 ft), 1991−2020 normals, extremes 1913−present)
Month	Jan	Feb	Mar	Apr	May	Jun	Jul	Aug	Sep	Oct	Nov	Dec	Year
Record high °C (°F)	23.6 (74.5)	23.4 (74.1)	23.9 (75.0)	26.2 (79.2)	29.4 (84.9)	30.8 (87.4)	35.6 (96.1)	36.1 (97.0)	33.8 (92.8)	30.0 (86.0)	27.2 (81.0)	23.3 (73.9)	36.1 (97.0)
Mean maximum °C (°F)	17.6 (63.7)	18.9 (66.0)	20.7 (69.3)	23.4 (74.1)	26.5 (79.7)	28.4 (83.1)	31.8 (89.2)	32.3 (90.1)	30.8 (87.4)	27.6 (81.7)	23.6 (74.5)	20.3 (68.5)	32.8 (91.0)
Mean daily maximum °C (°F)	11.4 (52.5)	12.4 (54.3)	15.2 (59.4)	18.8 (65.8)	22.5 (72.5)	24.7 (76.5)	28.2 (82.8)	29.8 (85.6)	27.6 (81.7)	23.2 (73.8)	18.7 (65.7)	13.8 (56.8)	20.5 (68.9)
Daily mean °C (°F)	8.3 (46.9)	8.8 (47.8)	11.6 (52.9)	15.6 (60.1)	19.3 (66.7)	22.1 (71.8)	25.7 (78.3)	26.9 (80.4)	24.6 (76.3)	20.3 (68.5)	15.5 (59.9)	10.6 (51.1)	17.5 (63.5)
Mean daily minimum °C (°F)	5.2 (41.4)	5.3 (41.5)	8.2 (46.8)	12.3 (54.1)	16.6 (61.9)	19.9 (67.8)	23.8 (74.8)	24.8 (76.6)	22.1 (71.8)	17.7 (63.9)	12.4 (54.3)	7.5 (45.5)	14.6 (58.3)
Mean minimum °C (°F)	0.5 (32.9)	0.7 (33.3)	2.4 (36.3)	6.2 (43.2)	12.3 (54.1)	16.3 (61.3)	20.5 (68.9)	21.9 (71.4)	18.0 (64.4)	12.6 (54.7)	7.0 (44.6)	2.7 (36.9)	−0.1 (31.8)
Record low °C (°F)	−3.6 (25.5)	−5.0 (23.0)	−2.2 (28.0)	1.5 (34.7)	7.3 (45.1)	12.5 (54.5)	15.3 (59.5)	18.1 (64.6)	14.2 (57.6)	7.7 (45.9)	2.5 (36.5)	−2.0 (28.4)	−5.0 (23.0)
Average precipitation mm (inches)	97.7 (3.85)	118.1 (4.65)	185.5 (7.30)	212.3 (8.36)	236.7 (9.32)	364.7 (14.36)	298.4 (11.75)	260.3 (10.25)	339.2 (13.35)	286.6 (11.28)	152.0 (5.98)	102.9 (4.05)	2,654.3 (104.50)
Average precipitation days (≥ 0.5 mm)	7.1	8.3	11.8	11.4	11.9	15.8	12.9	12.4	13.2	12.0	9.3	7.0	133.1
Average relative humidity (%)	58	58	62	68	75	84	86	84	78	72	64	60	71
Mean monthly sunshine hours	192.5	187.9	198.6	201.9	193.2	132.4	193.2	234.8	176.8	169.8	177.5	194.0	2,255.9
Source: Japan Meteorological Agency

== Gallery ==
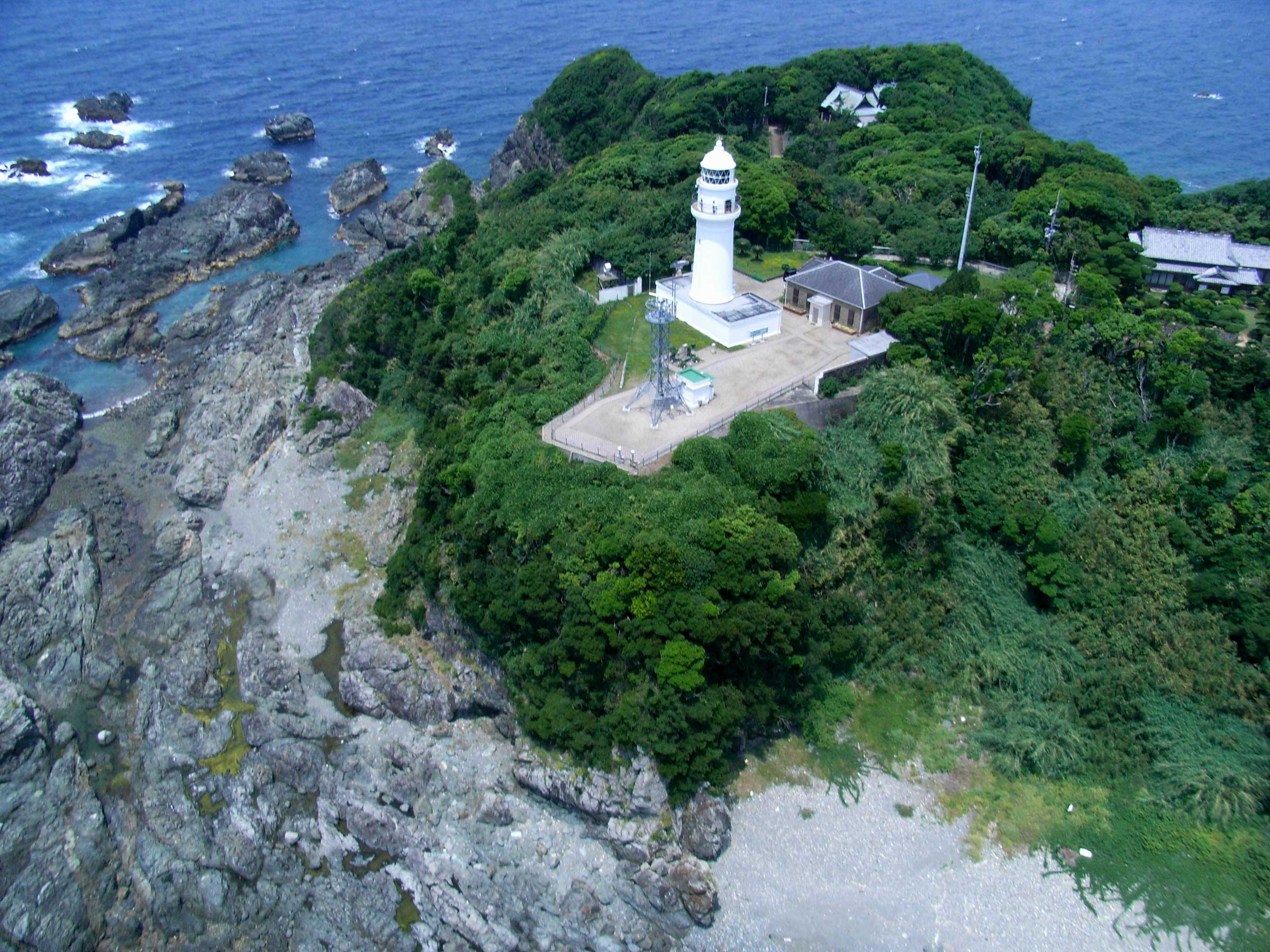
Shionomisaki Lighthouse

Shionomisaki Tower

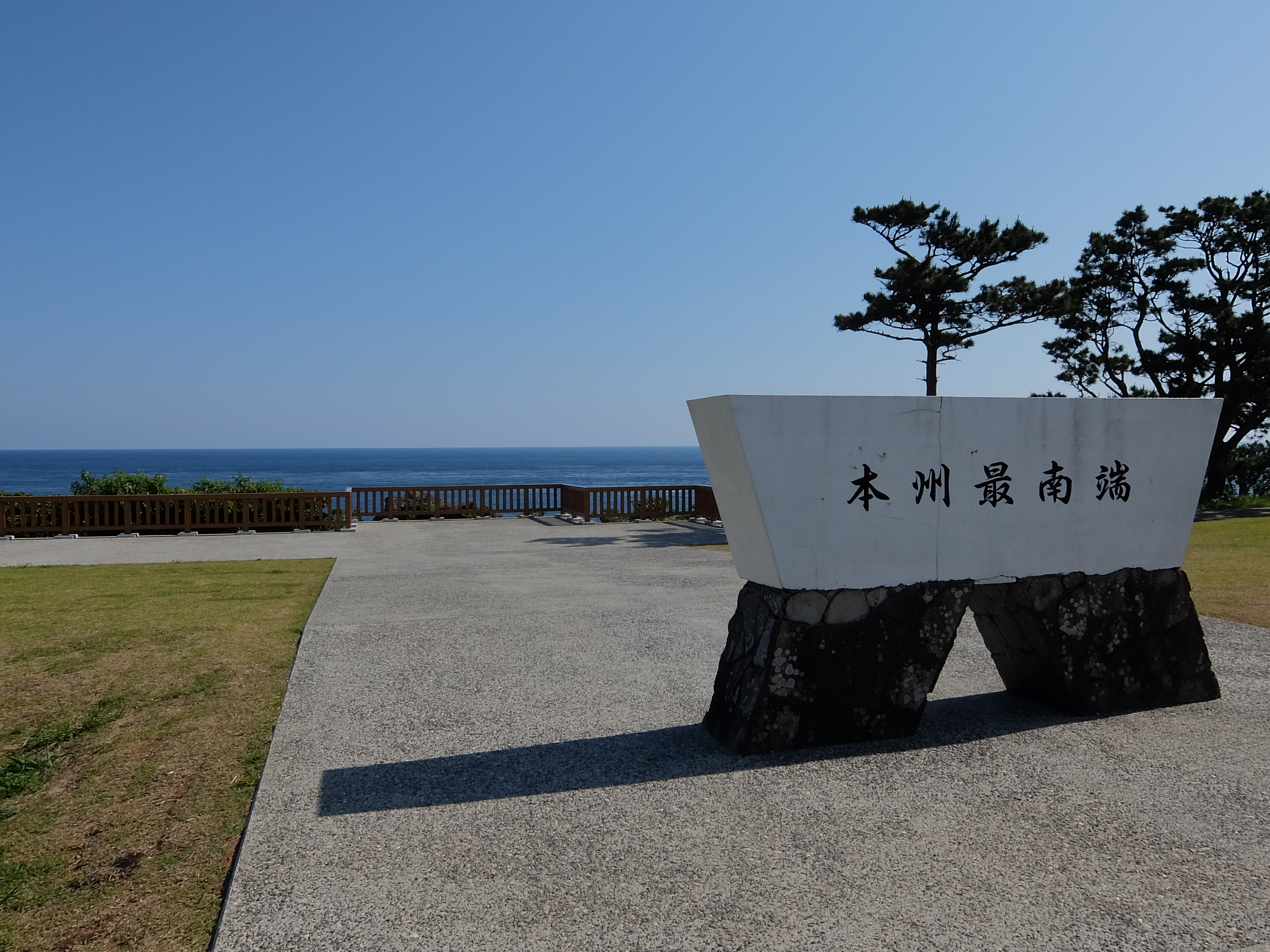
Monument marking the southernmost point of Honshu

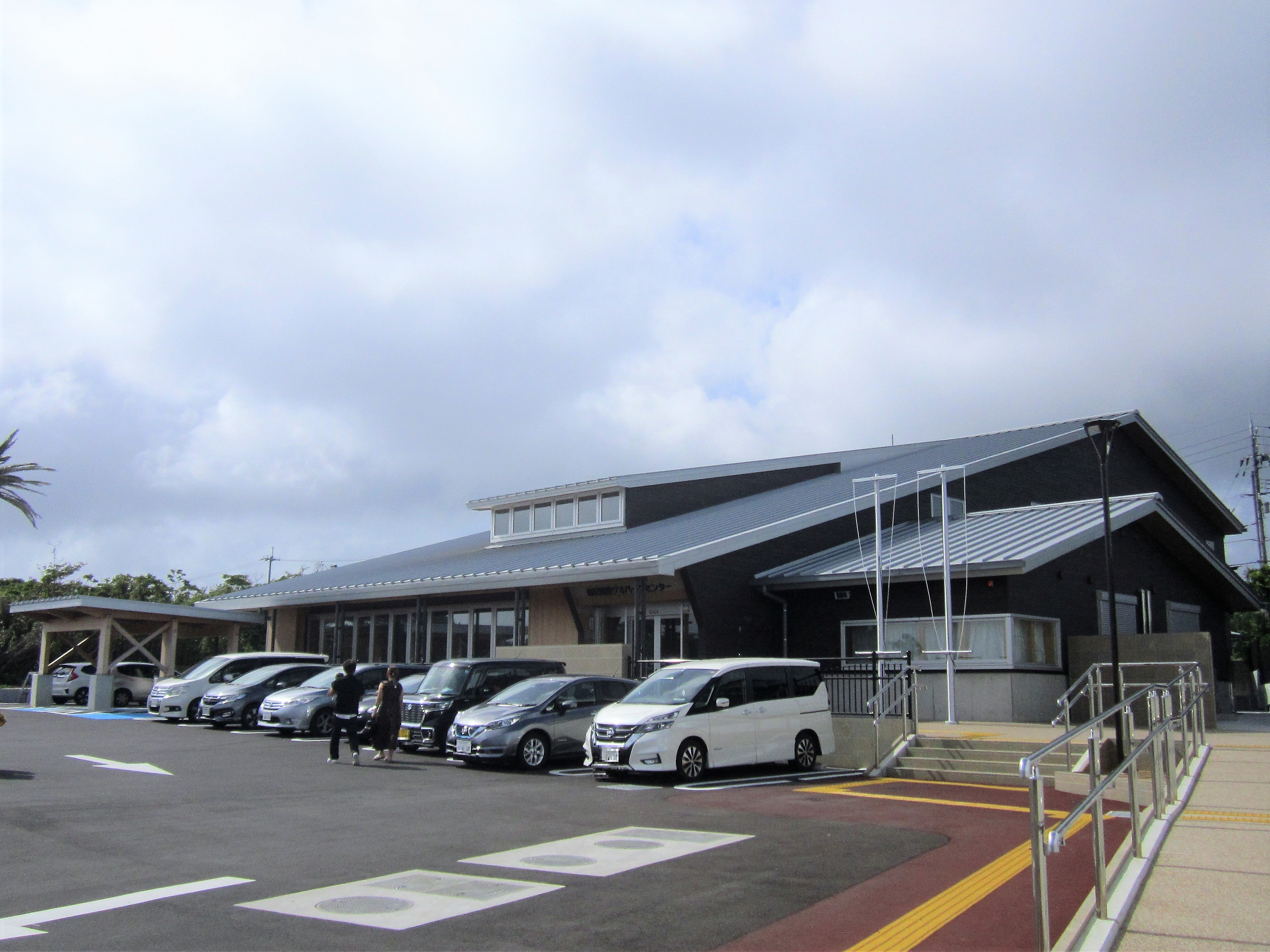
Nanki Kumano Geopark Center
