= Shionomisaki Lighthouse =

Shionomisaki Lighthouse 潮岬灯台
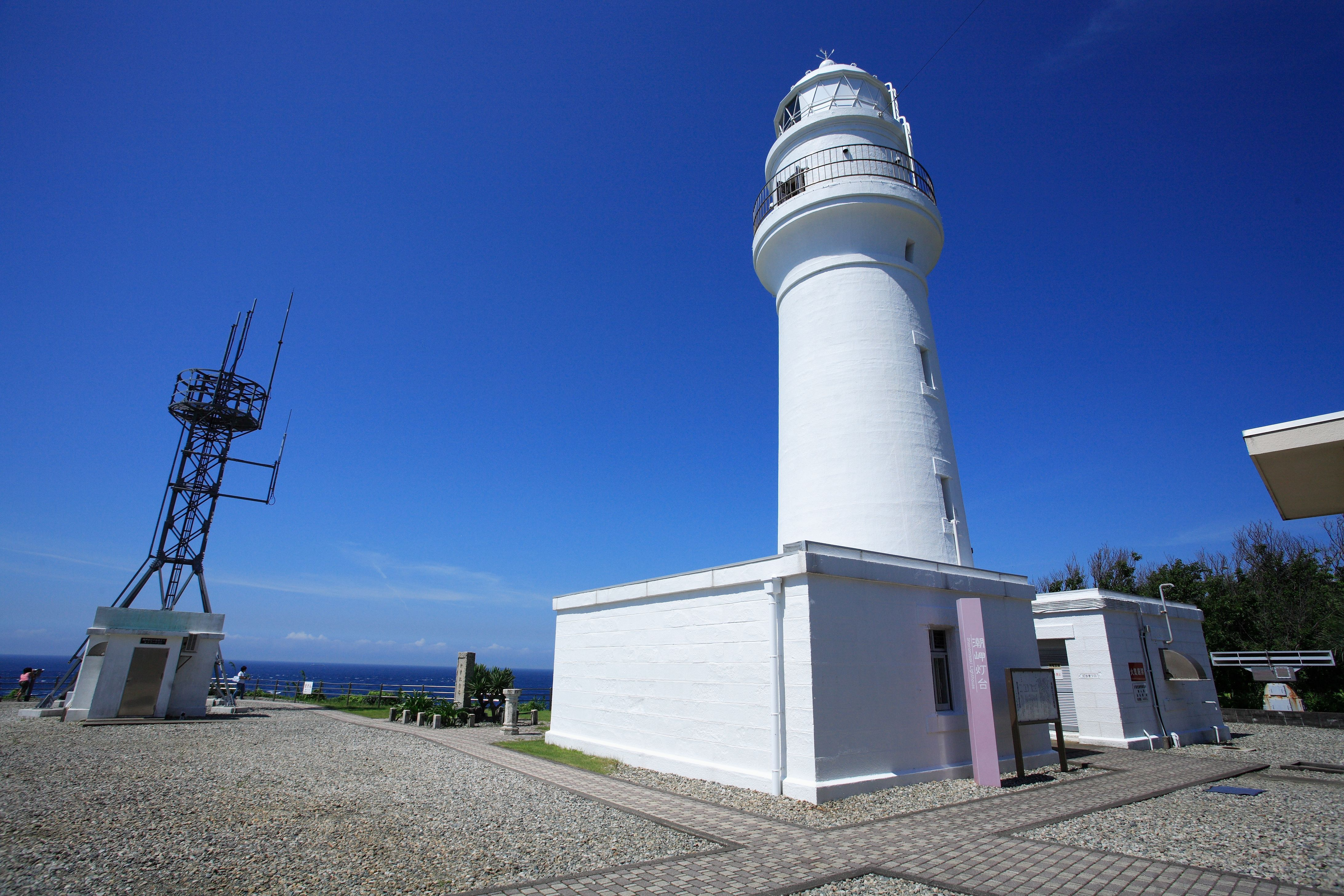
- Shionomisaki Lighthouse
- Location: Cape Shionomisaki, Kushimoto, Japan
- Coordinates: 33°26′15″N 135°45′16″E

Tower
- Constructed: 1870
- Construction: stone
- Height: 22.51 m (73.9 ft)
- Shape: cylindrical tower with gallery and lantern
- Markings: White (tower), white (lantern)
- Operator: 5th Regional Coast Guard Headquarters

Light
- First lit: 15 September 1873
- Focal height: 49.47 m (162.3 ft)
- Lens: first order Fresnel lens, second order Fresnel lens (1929–)
- Intensity: 970,000 candela
- Range: 19 nmi (35 km; 22 mi)
- Characteristic: Fl W 15s
- Japan no.: JCG-2902

Shionomisaki Lighthouse (潮岬灯台, Shionomisaki tōdai) is a lighthouse located on Cape Shionomisaki, on the southern coast of Kii Peninsula in the Kansai region of Japan. Administratively, it is within the town of Kushimoto, Wakayama Prefecture.

== History ==
On June 25, 1866, the Tokugawa shogunate of Edo period Japan signed a customs and tax treaty with the United States, Great Britain, France, and the Netherlands to normalize trade relations, One of the stipulations of this treaty was that eight lighthouses be erected near the approaches to the treaty ports opened for foreign commerce.(Kannonzaki, Nojimasaki, Kashinozaki, Mikomotojima, Kusaki, Iojima, Cape Sata, and Shionomisaki). However, due to the Boshin War, work was not begun until after the Meiji restoration. The new Meiji government brought in foreign advisors to assist in the modernization efforts, one of whom was the British engineer Richard Henry Brunton who specialized in lighthouse design. Aside from the eight lighthouses stipulated by the treaty (i.e. the "treaty lighthouses"), Brunton went on to constructed another 25 lighthouses from far northern Hokkaidō to southern Kyūshū during his career in Japan.

Work on the Shionomisaki Lighthouse began in June 1870, and it was first lit on June 10, 1870, with a temporary lighting system. The original structure was an octagonal wooden building, and it was to have been the first western-style wooden lighthouse in Japan; however, the ship containing the light mechanism from the United Kingdom sank in the East China Sea en route to Japan, and Brunton was forced to improvise using the lantern from a steam locomotive instead. The main lighting equipment was repeatedly delayed, and it was not until September 15, 1873, that its intended light system was installed and declared operational.

The lighthouse was rebuilt in April 1878 with the current stone structure. In 1929, the lighting system was replaced with a second-class Fresnel immovable lens and an oil-evaporated incandescent lamp, and the system was electrified in 1938. This lamp was replaced with a 90-cm rotary lamp in 1957.

The lighthouse is within the borders of the Yoshino-Kumano National Park. The lighthouse is now operated by the Japan Coast Guard 5th Regional Headquarters

== Gallery ==
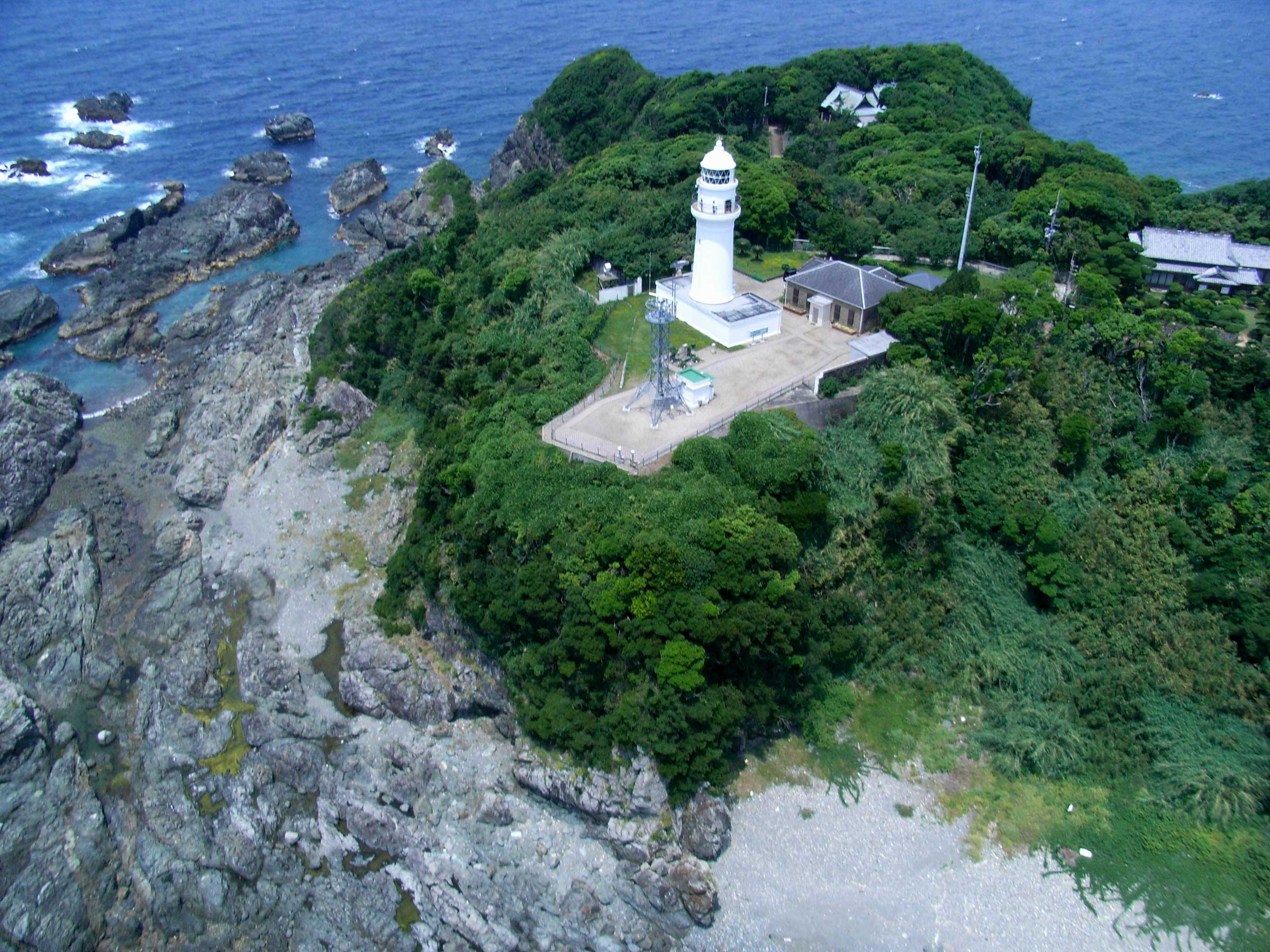
Aerial photograph of Shionomisaki Lighthouse

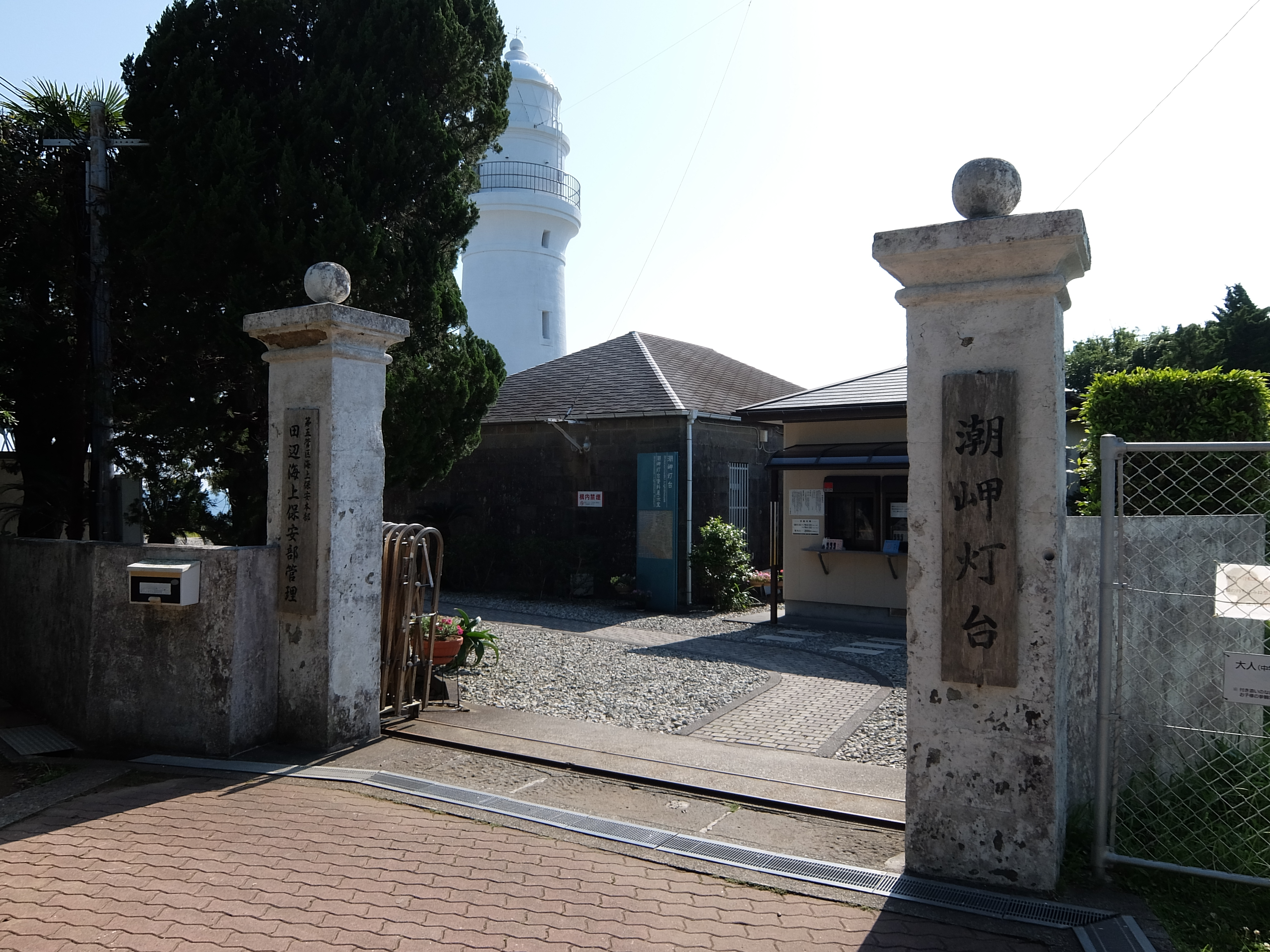
Entrance

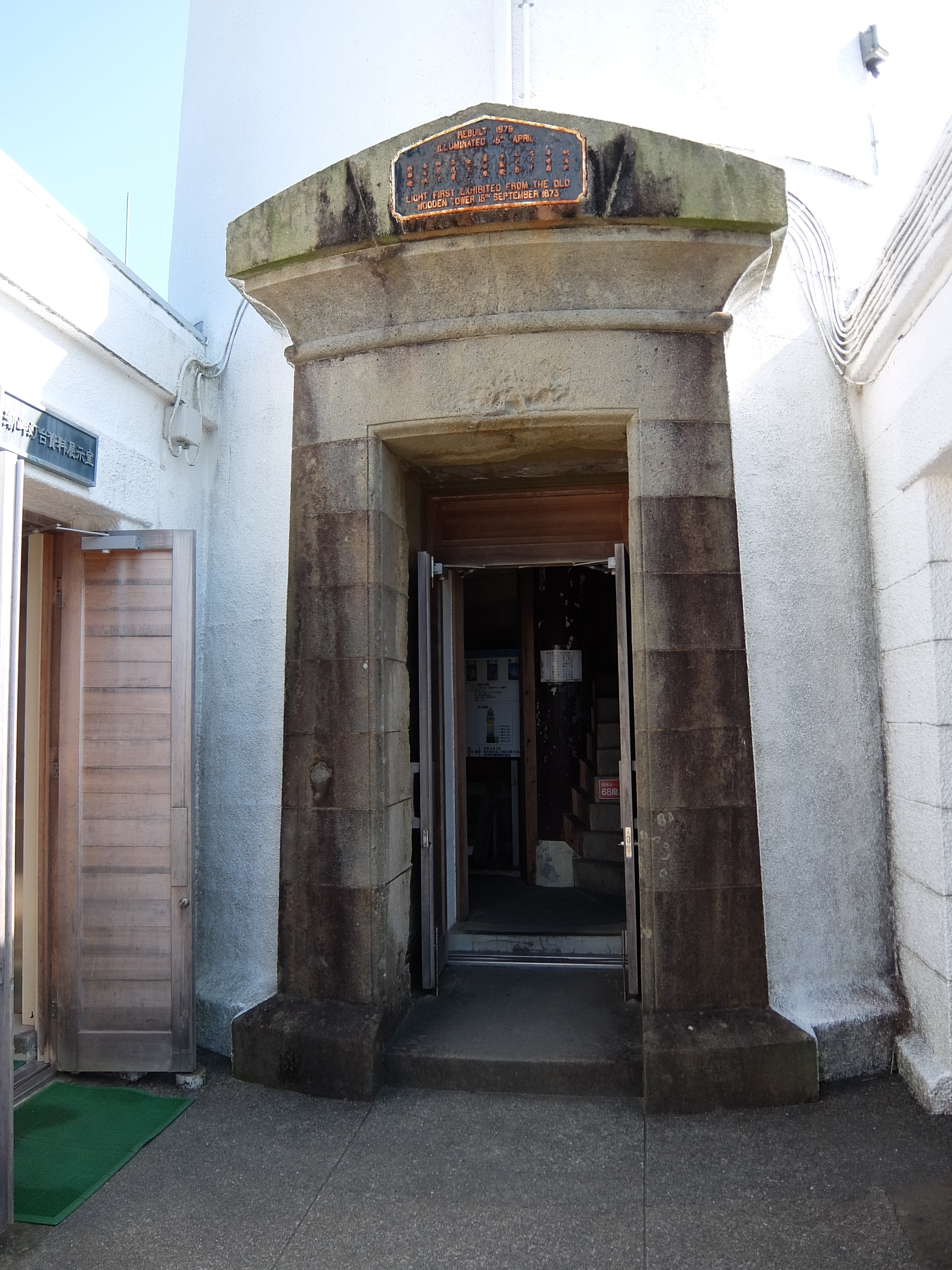
Entrance to the lighthouse

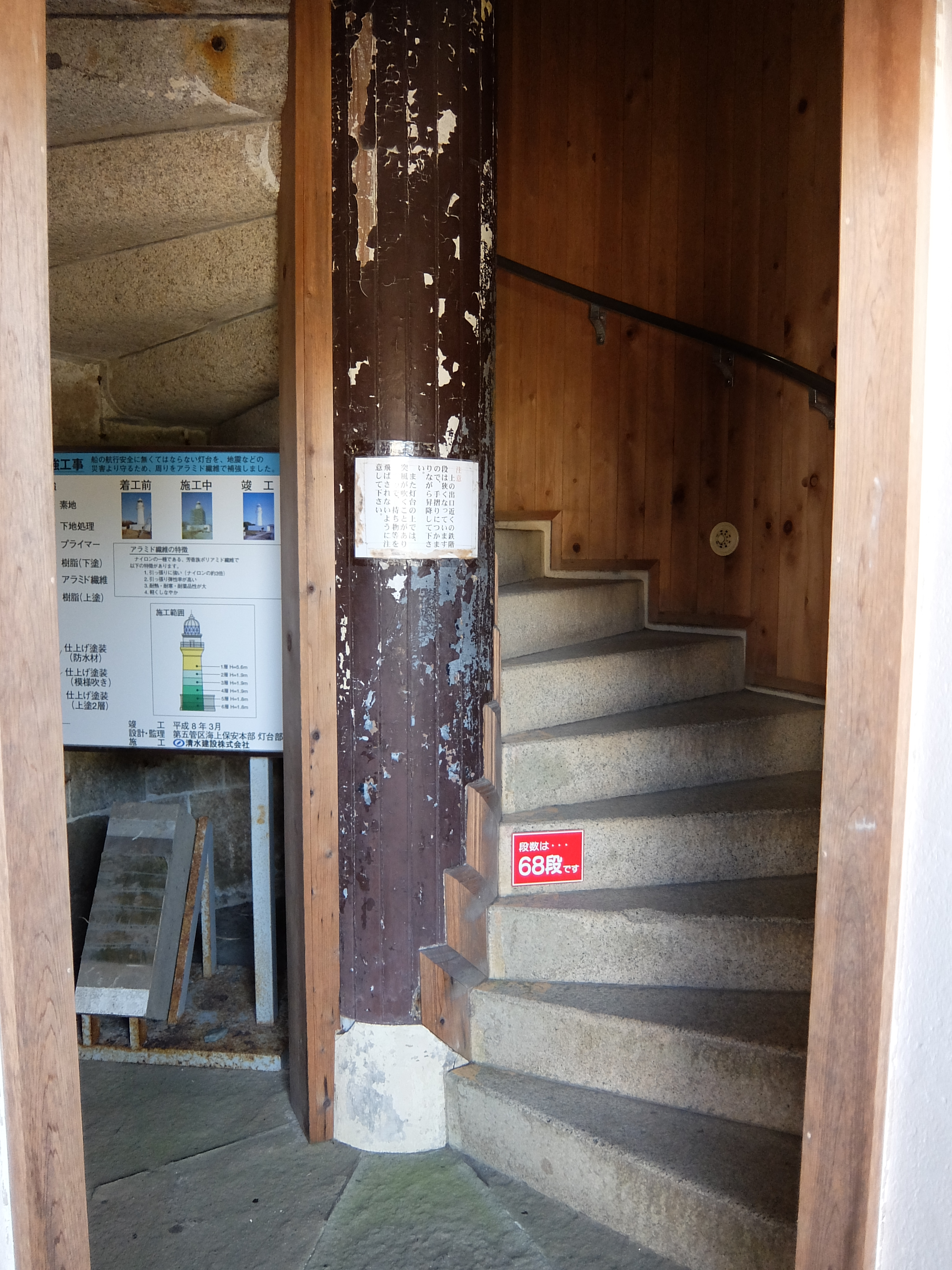
Interior of the lighthouse

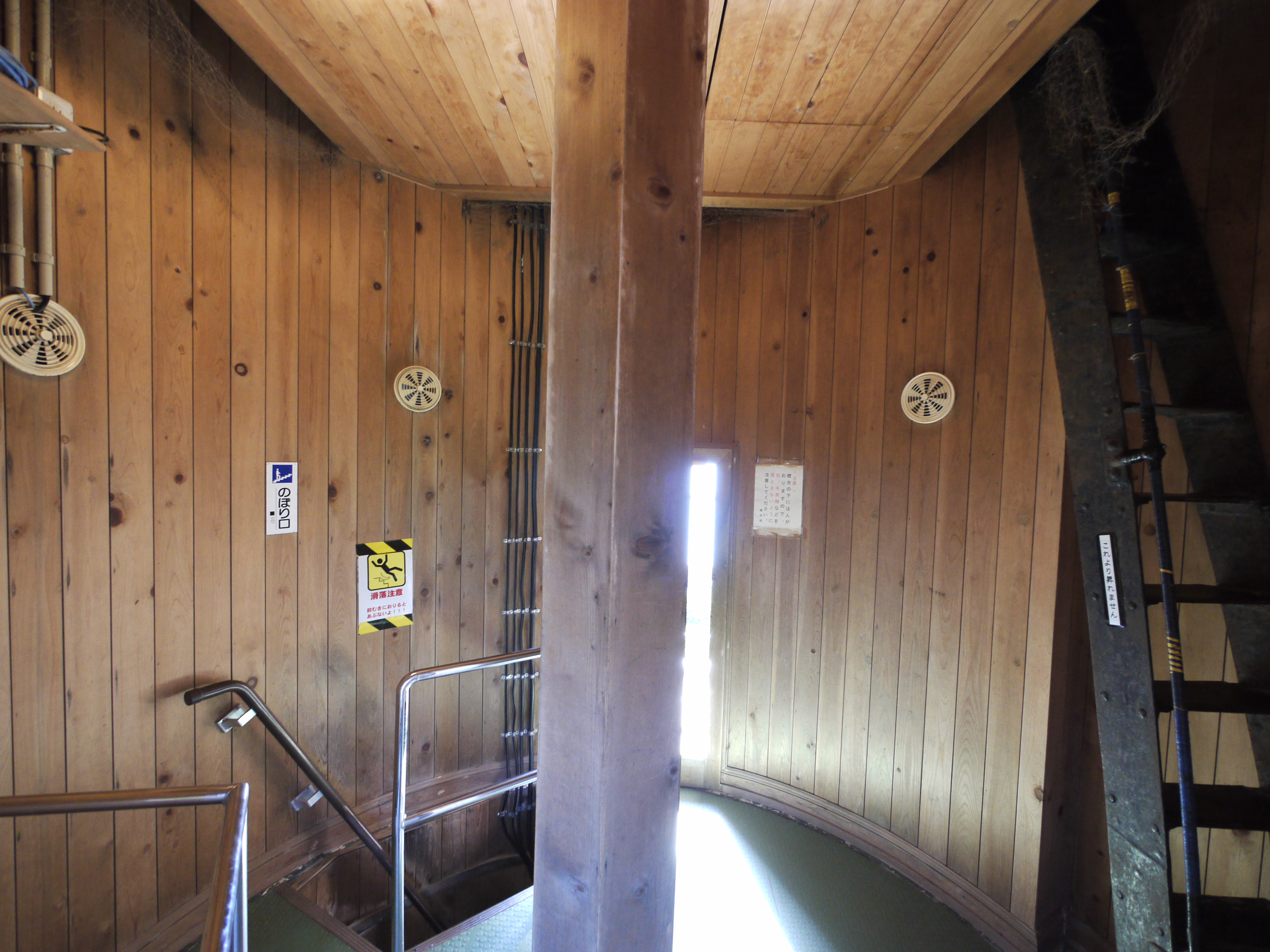
Interior of the lighthouse

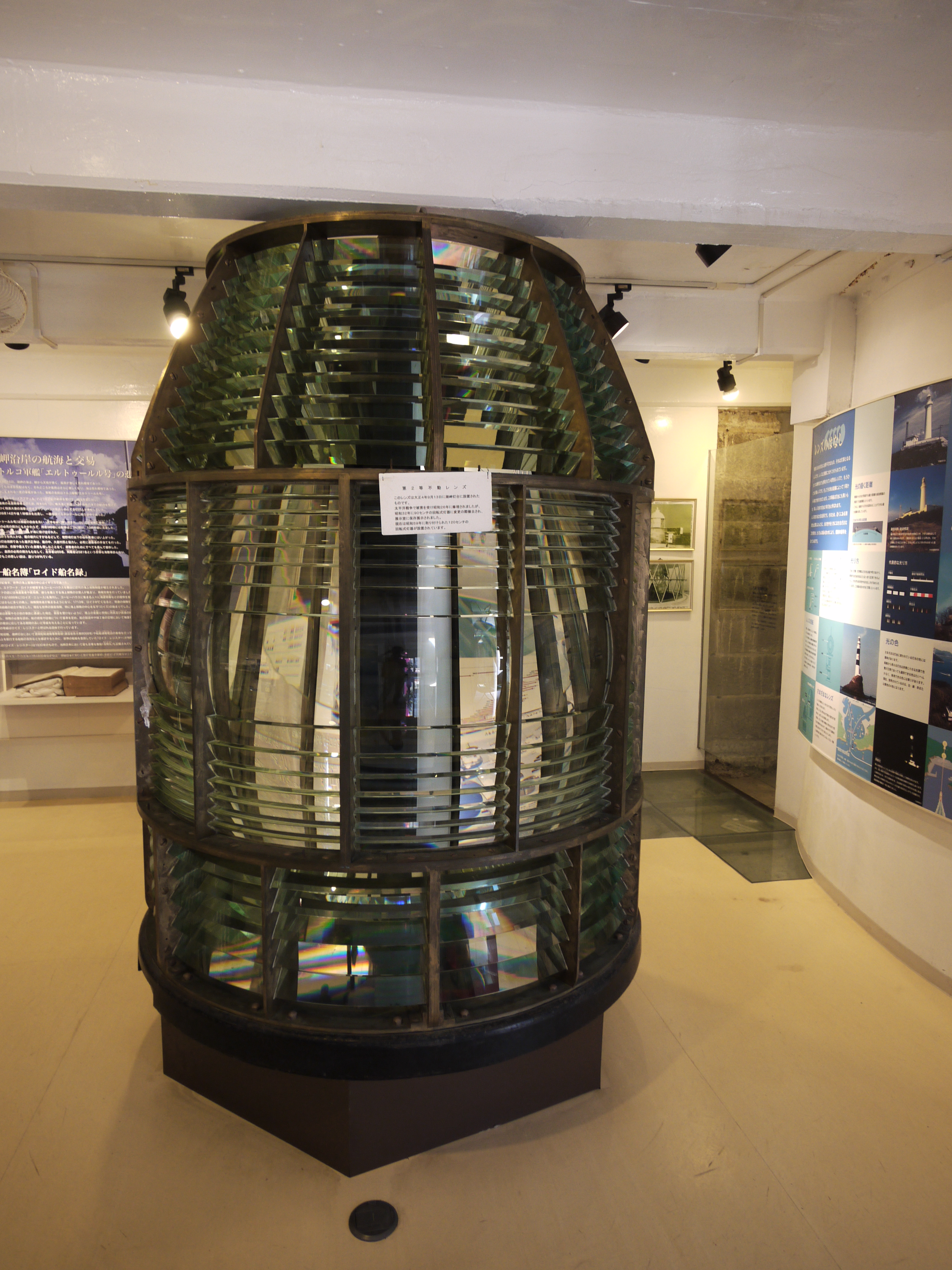
2nd degree Fresnel lens system

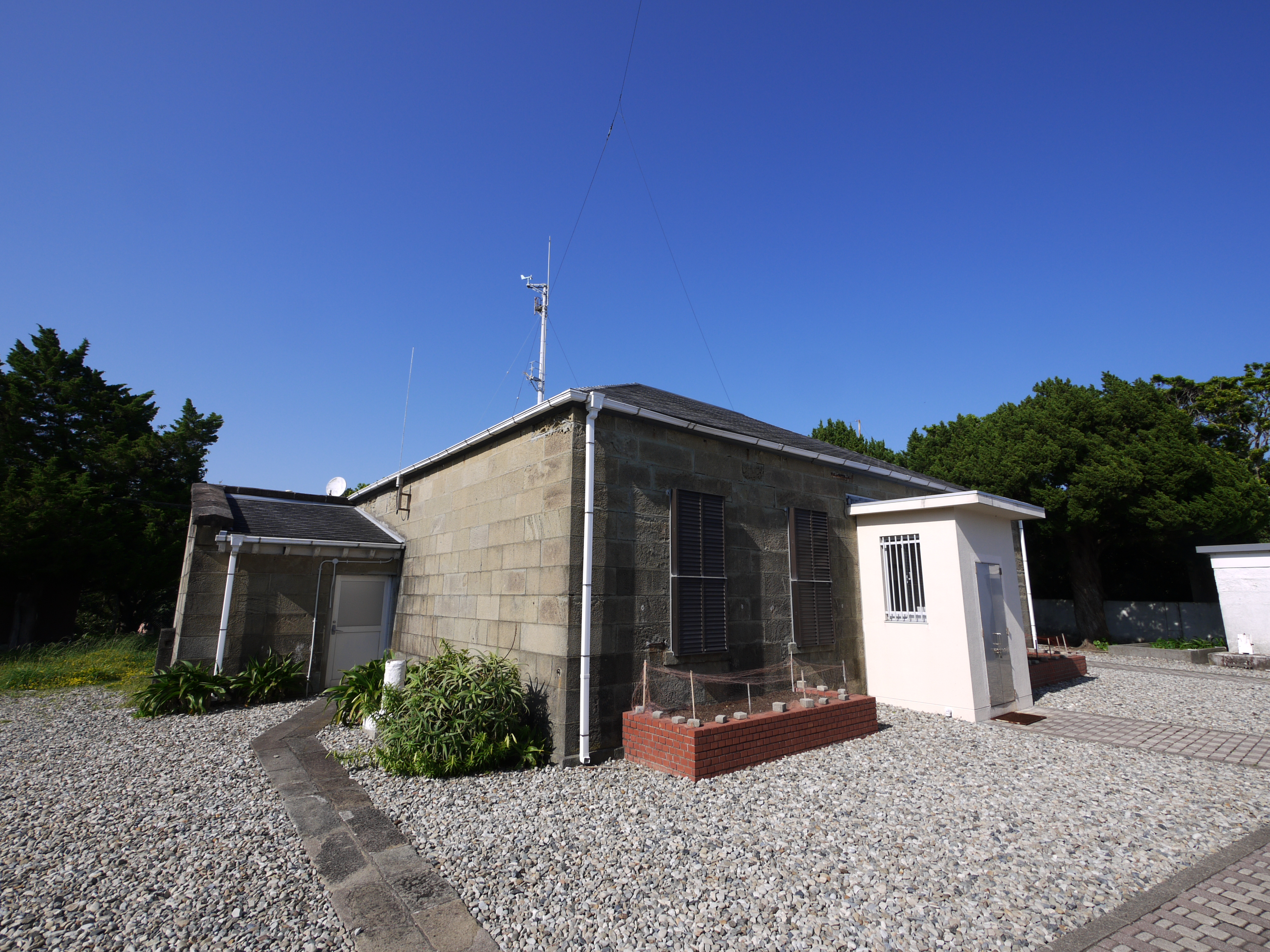
lightkeeper's house (also by Brunton)

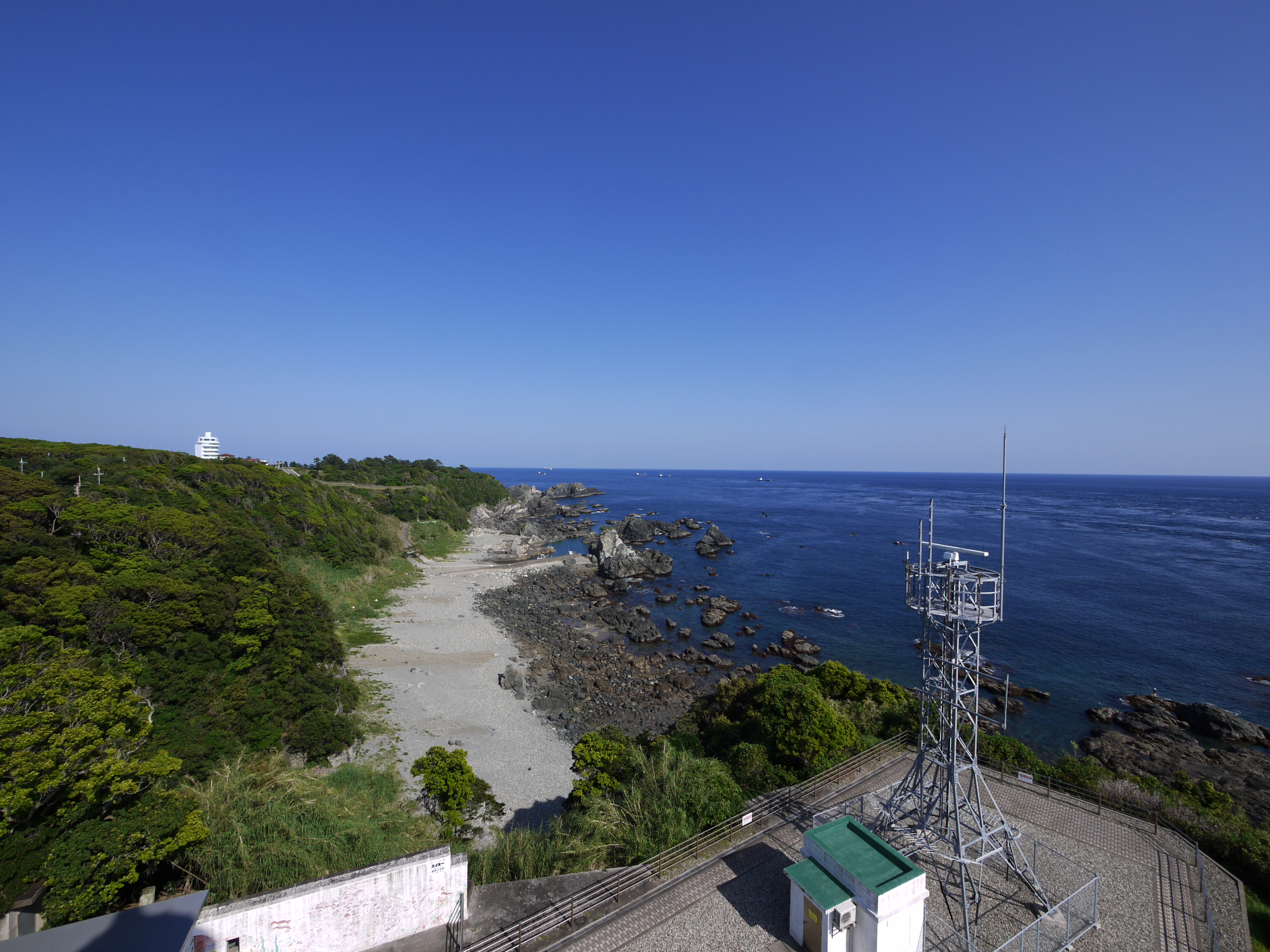
View from the lighthouse

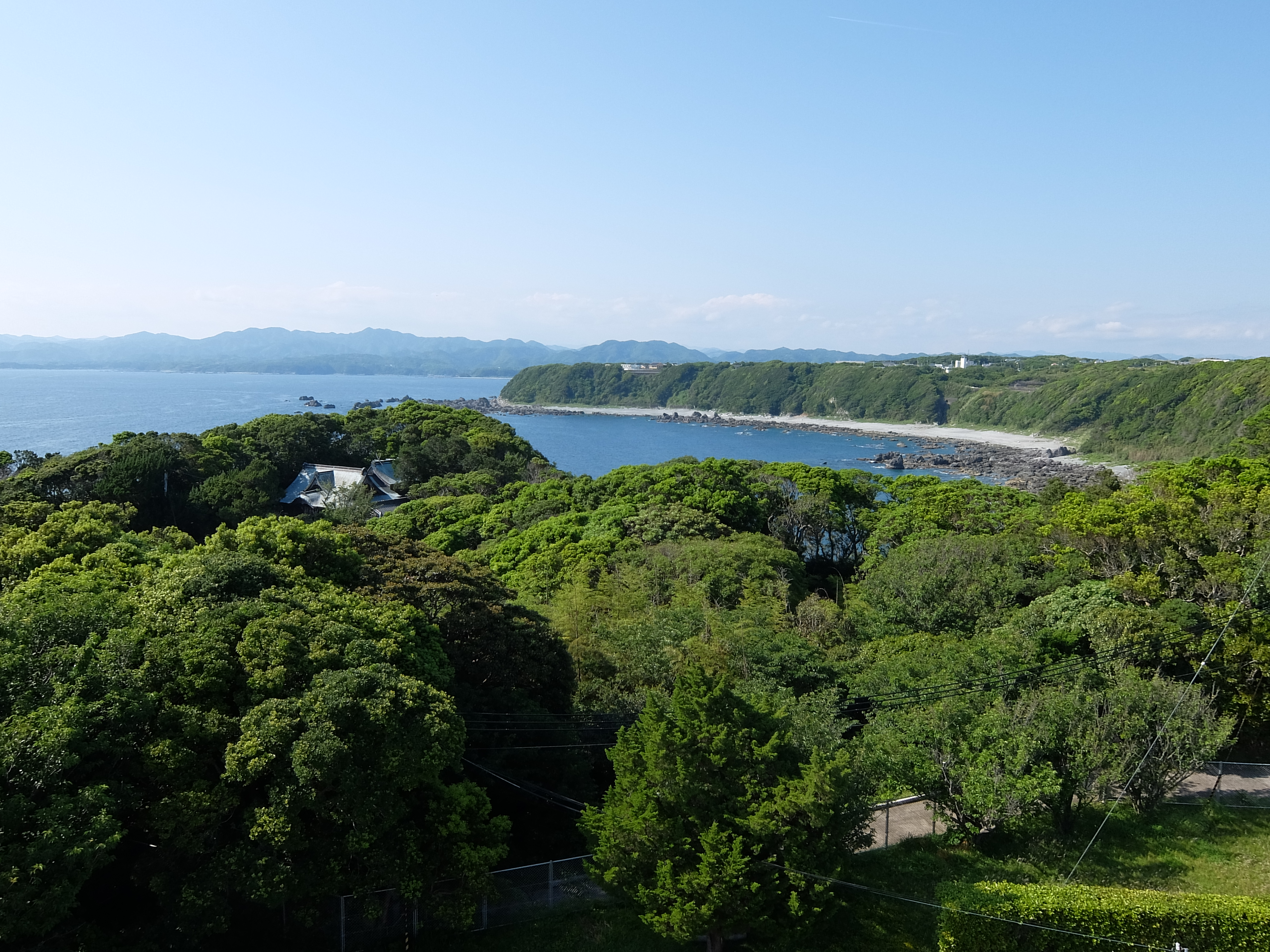
View from the lighthouse

== See also ==
- List of lighthouses in Japan
